The following is a list of notable people born, raised, or closely associated with the U.S. state of New Jersey.

Born and raised in New Jersey

A–F

 Brenden Aaronson (born 2000), professional soccer player for Leeds United and the United States men's national soccer team (Medford)
 Bud Abbott (1895–1974), actor and comedian (Asbury Park)
 Isa Abdul-Quddus (born 1988), safety for the Detroit Lions (Union)
 Joseph Alexander Adams (1803–1880), engraver (born in New Germantown)
 Mike Adams (born 1981), safety for the Houston Texans (Paterson)
 Timothy Adams (born 1967), actor, Sunset Beach, Ocean Ave. (Belleville)
 Charles Addams (1912–1988), cartoonist; creator of The Addams Family (Westfield)
 Ryan Adeleye (born 1985), Israeli-American professional soccer defender who has played for Hapoel Ashkelon
 Charlie Adler (born 1956), voice actor; the Transformers movies (Paterson)
 Monica Aksamit (born 1990), saber fencer; won a bronze medal at the 2016 Summer Olympics in the Women's Saber Team competition
 Jordan Alan (born 1967), filmmaker (Bayonne)
 Mitch Albom (born 1958), writer, broadcaster, and musician (Passaic)
 Buzz Aldrin (born 1930), NASA astronaut, second man to walk on the moon (born in Glen Ridge, grew up in Montclair)
 Jason Alexander (born 1959), actor, George Costanza on Seinfeld, Hugo in The Hunchback of Notre Dame (Newark, raised in Livingston)
 Jay Alford (born 1983), former NFL defensive tackle (Orange)
 Samuel Alito (born 1950), U.S. Supreme Court justice (Trenton, raised in Hamilton)
 Livingston Allen (born 1991) Hip Hop YouTuber better known as DJ Akademiks and host for Spotify and Complex
 Malik Allen (born 1978), NBA player (Willingboro)
 Emma B. Alrich (1845-1925), journalist, writer, educator (Cape May County)
 Enzo Amore (born 1986), professional wrestler (Hackensack, raised in Waldwick)
 Harold Amos (1919–2003), microbiologist and Harvard Medical School professor (Pennsauken)
 John Amos (born 1939), actor, The Fresh Prince of Bel-Air, Good Times, The West Wing (Newark)
 Richard Anderson (1926–2016), actor, The Six Million Dollar Man, Kung Fu, The Bionic Woman (Long Branch)
 Jack Antonoff (born 1984), musician, guitarist for the band Fun (Bergenfield)
 Kristina Apgar (born 1985), actress, Privileged (Morristown)
 Virginia Apgar (1909–1974), obstetrical anesthesiologist, inventor of the Apgar score (Westfield)
 Billy Ard (born 1959), NFL player for New York Giants and Green Bay Packers (East Orange, raised in Watchung)
 Chris Argyris (1923–2013), business theorist, Professor Emeritus at Harvard Business School, and a Thought Leader at Monitor Group (Newark)
 Bruce Arians (born 1952), head coach for Arizona Cardinals (Paterson)
 Allan Arkush (born 1948), film and television director (Jersey City)
 Jillian Armenante (born 1968), actress, Judging Amy (Paterson)
 Rich Attonito (born 1977), mixed martial artist (Elizabeth)
 Paul Auster (born 1947), author, screenwriter (born in Newark, grew up in South Orange)
 Miles Austin (born 1984), wide receiver for the Philadelphia Eagles (born in Summit, grew up in Garfield)
 Jackie Autry (born 1941), Major League Baseball executive (Newark)
 Yael Averbuch (born 1986), soccer player
 Dan Avidan (born 1979), lead singer of Ninja Sex Party and Starbomb, and co-host of Game Grumps (Springfield Township)
 Robert Ayers (born 1985), defensive end for the New York Giants (Jersey City)
 Melissa Bacelar (born 1979), actress and scream queen (Piscataway)
 Bret Baier (born 1970), news anchor for the Fox News Channel, Special Report with Bret Baier (Rumson)
 Andrew Bailey (born 1984), relief pitcher for the Los Angeles Angels (Haddon Heights)
 David Bailey (1933–2004), actor, Another World (Voorhees)
 Sean Baker (born 1971), director, Tangerine, The Florida Project (Summit)
 Esther E. Baldwin (1840-1910), missionary, teacher, writer (Marlton) 	
 Wade Baldwin IV (born 1996), basketball player for Maccabi Tel Aviv of the Israeli Basketball Premier League.
 Amiri Baraka (1934–2014), poet (Newark)
 Michael Barkann (born 1960), radio talk show host, television host (East Brunswick)
 James J. Barry Jr. (born 1946), politician (Orange, raised in New Vernon)
 Rick Barry (born 1944), NBA and ABA small forward and Hall of Fame inductee (Elizabeth, grew up in Roselle Park)
 James Barton (1890–1962), actor (Gloucester City)
 Danny Basavich (born 1978), professional pool player (Manalapan)
 Dana Bash (born 1971), CNN reporter and anchorwoman (Montvale)
 Count Basie (1904–1984), jazz pianist, organist, bandleader (Red Bank)
 Ellen Bass (born 1947), professor, poet, and author (raised in Pleasantville and Ventnor City)
 Bruce Baumgartner (born 1961), freestyle wrestler, two-time Olympic champion, four-time Olympic medalist, three-time World champion, nine-time World medalist (Haledon)
 Beetlejuice, a.k.a. Lester Green (born 1968), entertainer, guest on The Howard Stern Show (Jersey City)
 Bo Belinsky (1936–2001), Major League Baseball player
 Amir Bell (born 1996), basketball player in the Israel Basketball Premier League
 Emma Bell (born 1986), actress (Woodstown)
 Madeline Bell (born 1942), soul singer (Newark)
 Bill Bellamy (born 1965), actor, comedian (Newark)
 Regina Belle (born 1963), singer (Englewood)
 Stephen Benkovic (born 1938), chemist, National Academy of Sciences inductee (Orange)
 Joan Bennett (1910–1990), actress (Palisades Park)
 Kafi Benz (born 1941), writer and conservationist (Chatham)
 Jay Berger (born 1966), tennis player; highest world ranking #7
 Xander Berkeley (born 1955), actor (Mendham)
 Adam Bernstein (born 1960), video director and producer (Princeton
 Alessandra Biaggi (born 1986), New York State Senator.
 Mike Bibby (born 1978), NBA player (Cherry Hill)
 Jack Bicknell Jr. (born 1963), offensive line coach for the Kansas City Chiefs (North Plainfield)
 Bam Bam Bigelow (1961–2007), professional wrestler (Asbury Park)
 Jason Biggs (born 1978), actor, American Pie, American Pie 2, American Wedding, American Reunion (Hasbrouck Heights)
 Mary Birdsong (born 1968), actress, comedian Reno 911! (Long Beach Island)
 Roger Birnbaum (born ), film producer, Four Christmases, 27 Dresses, Eight Below, Mr. 3000, Six Days Seven Nights (Teaneck)
 Sofia Black-D'Elia (born 1991), actress, All My Children, Skins, The Messengers (Clifton)
 Vivian Blaine (1921–1995), actress and singer, Guys and Dolls (Newark)
 Betsy Blair (1923–2009), actress, Marty (Cliffside Park)
 Tammy Blanchard (born 1976), actress (Bayonne)
 Carol Blazejowski (born 1956), Hall of Fame basketball player (Elizabeth)
 Al Blozis (1919–1945), New York Giants tackle, died as a soldier in combat during World War II (Garfield)
 Mark Blum (1950–2020), actor (Newark)
 Judy Blume (born 1938), author (Elizabeth)
 Peter Boettke (born 1960), economist of the Austrian School (Rahway)
 Tim Bogert (1944–2021), bass guitarist and vocalist for Vanilla Fudge, Cactus, and Beck, Bogert & Appice (Ridgefield)
 Clint Bolick (born 1957), attorney and prominent school choice advocate (Elizabeth)
 Jon Bon Jovi (born 1962), musician (Sayreville; born in Perth Amboy)
 Denise Borino (1964–2010), actress, Ginny Sacramoni on The Sopranos (Roseland)
 Joe Borowski (born 1971), former MLB pitcher, current sportscaster for the Arizona Diamondbacks (Bayonne)
 Philip Bosco (1930–2018), actor (Jersey City)
 Dennis Boutsikaris (born 1952), actor (Newark)
 Katrina Bowden (born 1988), actress, Cerie on 30 Rock (Wyckoff)
 Todd Bowles (born 1963), former head coach of the New York Jets of (Elizabeth)
 Brad Brach (born 1986), relief pitcher for the Atlanta Braves (Freehold)
 Gary Brackett (born 1980), middle linebacker for the Indianapolis Colts (Glassboro)
 Zach Braff (born 1975), actor, Scrubs, Chicken Little (South Orange)
 Debbie Bramwell-Washington (born 1966), IFBB professional bodybuilder
 John Brennan (born 1954), Director of the Central Intelligence Agency (North Bergen)
 William J. Brennan Jr. (1906–1997), U.S. Supreme Court justice (Newark)
 David Brewster, publisher and journalist (Newark)
 Ralph L. Brinster (born 1932), geneticist (Montclair, raised in Cedar Grove)
 Kenny Britt (born 1988), wide receiver for the New England Patriots (Bayonne)
 Tal Brody (born 1943), American-Israeli basketball player
 Betty Bronson (1906–1971), actress, Peter Pan (Trenton)
 Jacqueline Brookes (1930–2013), actress (Montclair)
 Dave Brown (born 1970), quarterback for the New York Giants and Arizona Cardinals (Summit)
 Donald Brown (born 1987), running back for the Indianapolis Colts (Atlantic Highlands)
 Ella Barksdale Brown, journalist, educator (Jersey City)
 Roscoe Lee Browne (1925–2007), actor, The Cowboys, The Mambo Kings (Woodbury)
 Lou Brutus (born 1972), radio host, musician, photographer (Newark, raised in Englistown)
 David Bryan (born 1962), musician (Perth Amboy)
 Mark Bryant (born 1965), NBA player, assistant coach (Glen Ridge, raised in South Orange)
 John D. Bulkeley (1911–1996), vice admiral in United States Navy, Medal of Honor recipient
 King Kong Bundy (1955–2019), professional wrestler, stand-up comedian, actor (Atlantic City)
 Jake Burbage (born 1992), actor Grounded for Life (Willingboro)
 Richard Burgi (born 1958), actor Desperate Housewives, The Sentinel (Montclair)
 Aaron Burr (1756–1836), third Vice President of the United States (Newark)
 Jordan Burroughs (born 1988), freestyle wrestler, Olympic gold medalist, four-time World Champion (Sicklerville)
 Glen Burtnik (born 1955), musician (North Brunswick)
 Da'Sean Butler (born 1987), basketball player for Hapoel Be'er Sheva of the Israeli Premier League
 Nicholas Murray Butler (1862–1947), Nobel Prize-winning philosopher, diplomat, and educator (Elizabeth)
 Greg Buttle (born 1954), linebacker for the New York Jets (Atlantic City, raised in Linwood)
 Andrew Bynum (born 1987), center for the Philadelphia 76ers (Plainsboro)
 Brendan Byrne (1924–2018), Governor of New Jersey (West Orange)
 P. J. Byrne (born 1974), actor, The Game (South Orange)
 Michael Cade (born 1972), actor, California Dreams (Elmwood Park)
 Joseph Caldwell (1773–1835), mathematician, first president of the University of North Carolina (Lamington)
 Alisyn Camerota (born 1969), news anchor for CNN (Shrewsbury)
 John W. Campbell (1910–1971), science fiction writer and editor, Analog Science Fiction and Fact (Newark)
 William Campbell (1923–2011), actor (Newark)
 Bobby Cannavale (born 1971), actor, Bobby Caffey on Third Watch (Union City)
 Philip Carey (1925–2009), actor, One Life to Live (Hackensack)
 Ron Carey (1935–2007), actor, Barney Miller (Newark)
 Julie Carmen (born 1954), actress (Millburn)
 Thomas Carpenter (1752–1847), a patriot of the American Revolutionary War; born in Salem, died in Carpenter's Landing
 Rosalind Cash (1938–1995), actress (Atlantic City)
 Jonathan Casillas (born 1987), linebacker for the New York Giants (New Brunswick)
 David Cassidy (1950–2017), actor/singer, star of the 1970s television show The Partridge Family (West Orange)
 Joanna Cassidy (born 1945), actress, Blade Runner, Who Framed Roger Rabbit, Six Feet Under (Haddonfield)
 Iván Castro (born 1967), U.S. Army captain serving on active duty in the Special Forces despite losing his eyesight (Hoboken)
 Sean Chandler (born 1996), safety for New York Giants (Camden)
 Michael Chang (born 1972), professional tennis player (Hoboken)
 Cheryl Chase (born 1958), voice actress, Angelica Pickles on Rugrats (Manville)
 Jeff Chase (born 1968), actor (Paterson)
 Mike Chernoff (born ), general manager of the Cleveland Indians (Livingston)
 Michael Chertoff (born 1953), U.S. Secretary of Homeland Security under President George W. Bush (Elizabeth)
 Aneesh Chopra (born 1972), chief technology officer under Barack Obama (Trenton, raised in Princeton Junction)
 Chris Christie (born 1962), 55th governor of New Jersey (Newark)
 Jack Ciattarelli (born 1961), politician (Hillsborough)
 Vinny Ciurciu (born 1980), National Football League linebacker (Hackensack)
 Earl Clark (born 1988), forward for the Los Angeles Lakers (Plainfield)
 Harlan Coben (born 1962), author of mystery novels and thrillers (Newark, raised in Livingston)
 Robert Coello (born 1984), pitcher for the Toronto Blue Jays (Bayonne)
 Willie Cole (born 1955), sculptor (Newark)
 Ross Colton, (born 1996), ice hockey center for the Tampa Bay Lightning, (Robbinsonville)
 Mattea Conforti (born 2006), actress
 Kristen Connolly (born 1980), actress, As the World Turns, House of Cards, Zoo (Montclair)
 Richard Conte (1910–1975), actor, The Godfather (Jersey City)
 Kellyanne Conway (born 1967), campaign manager for Donald Trump, Counselor to the President (Camden, raised in Hammonton)
 Greg Coolidge (born 1972), actor, screenwriter, director (Red Bank)
 David Copperfield (born 1956), illusionist (Metuchen)
 Sam Coppola (1932–2012), actor (Jersey City)
 Barbara Corcoran (born 1949), businesswoman, investor, and television personality (Edgewater)
 Joseph Cortese (born 1949), actor (Paterson)
 Phil Costa (born 1987), center and guard for the Dallas Cowboys (Moorestown)
 Blake Costanzo (born 1984), linebacker for the Chicago Bears (Franklin Lakes)
 Lou Costello (1906–1959), comedian, actor, Abbott and Costello films and television series (Paterson)
 Bob Cottingham (born 1966), Olympic sabre fencer, 1988 and 1992
 Jonathan Townley Crane (1819–1880), clergyman, author, abolitionist (Union Township)
 Stephen Crane (1871–1900), novelist, short story writer, poet, journalist (Newark)
 Michael Cristofer (born 1945), Pulitzer Prize and Tony Award-winning playwright; screenwriter; actor; director (Trenton)
 Joseph Cross (born 1986), actor, Running with Scissors, Flags of Our Fathers (New Brunswick)
 Crowbar (born 1974), professional wrestler (Rutherford)
 Valerie Cruz (born 1976), actress, Nip/Tuck, The Dresden Files, Dexter (Elizabeth)
 Victor Cruz (born 1986), wide receiver for the New York Giants (Paterson)
 Ken Cuccinelli (born 1968), Attorney General of Virginia (Edison)
 John T. Cunningham (1915–2012), journalist, writer, and historian (Newark, raised in Brookside)
 Vincent Curatola (born 1953), actor, Johnny Sack on The Sopranos (Englewood)
 Vinny Curry (born 1988), defensive end for the Philadelphia Eagles (Neptune)
 Brian Cushing (born 1987), outside linebacker for the Houston Texans (Park Ridge)
 Jack Cust (born 1979), designated hitter and outfielder for the New York Yankees (Flemington)
 Tawny Cypress (born 1976), actress, K-Ville, Heroes (Point Pleasant)
 Mike Daniels (born 1989), defensive end for the Green Bay Packers (Stratford)
 Joe Dante (born 1946), film director, Gremlins (Morristown)
 Glenn Danzig (born 1955), Misfits and Danzig frontman (Lodi)
 Jeff Datz (born 1959), third base coach for the Seattle Mariners (Camden)
 Dov Davidoff, comedian, actor (Englishtown)
 Anthony Davis (born 1989), offensive tackle for the San Francisco 49ers (Piscataway)
 Brett Davis (born 1988), comedian (Roxbury)
 Hope Davis (born 1964), actress, About Schmidt, American Splendor, The Hoax (Englewood)
 Lanny Davis (born 1946), Special Counsel to the President to Bill Clinton (Jersey City)
 Sandra Dee (1942–2005), actress, Gidget, A Summer Place (Bayonne)
 Robert De Grasse (1900–1971), cinematographer (Maplewood)
 Dean DeLeo (born 1961), guitarist for Stone Temple Pilots, Talk Show, Army of Anyone, Laughter Train (Montclair)
 Mark Delavan (born 1958), operatic bass-baritone (born in Princeton, lives in Chatham)
 Martina Deignan, soap opera actress, Santa Barbara, As the World Turns (East Orange)
 Mark DeRosa (born 1975), utility player for the Washington Nationals (Passaic)
 Beatie Deutsch (née Rabin; born 1989), ultra-Orthodox Jewish American-Israeli marathon runner
 Danny DeVito (born 1944), actor and director, Taxi, Hoffa, War of the Roses, Get Shorty, Batman Returns, It's Always Sunny in Philadelphia (Neptune City)
 Tommy DeVito (1928–2020), musician and singer; lead guitarist of The Four Seasons (Belleville)
 Khigh Dhiegh (1910–1991), actor, Wo Fat on Hawaii Five-O (Spring Lake)
 Ernest Dickerson (born 1951), film and television director (Newark)
 John DiMaggio (born 1968), voice actor, Bender on Futurama (North Plainfield)
 Pat DiNizio (1955–2017), singer, The Smithereens (Scotch Plains)
 Peter Dinklage (born 1969), actor, Elf, Game of Thrones (Morristown, raised in Mendham Township)
 Peter Dobson (born 1964), actor, Cover Me (Red Bank)
 Franklin D'Olier (1877–1953), businessman; first National Commander of the American Legion (1919–1920)
 Tate Donovan (born 1963), actor, Damages, The O.C., Hercules (Tenafly)
 Jamie Donnelly (born 1947), actress (Teaneck)
 Ruth Donnelly (1896–1982), actress (Trenton)
 Michael Douglas (born 1944), Academy Award-winning actor, producer (New Brunswick)
 Jim Dowd (born 1968), professional ice hockey player (Brick Township)
 Doyle Wolfgang von Frankenstein (born 1964), guitarist, The Misfits (Lodi)
 Al Downing (born 1941), professional baseball pitcher New York Yankees, Oakland A's, Milwaukee Brewers, Los Angeles Dodgers, NL Comeback Player of the Year 1971 (Trenton)
 Dylan Dreyer (born 1981), meteorologist for the Today Show (Manalapan)
 Derek Drymon (born 1965), cartoon producer, SpongeBob SquarePants (Morristown)
 Thomas F. Duffy (born 1955), actor (Woodbridge)
 Tom Dugan (born 1961), one-person show actor, writer and director (Rahway)
 Tabitha D'umo (born 1973), dance teacher, choreographer, and creative director (Galloway)
 Jancee Dunn (born 1966), journalist, author, and former VJ for MTV2 (Chatham)
 Ashley Alexandra Dupré (born 1985), prostitute, singer (Beachwood)
 Asher Brown Durand (1796–1886), artist (Maplewood)
 Lou Duva (1922–2017), boxing trainer and sports personality (Paterson)
 Andrea Dworkin (1946–2005), radical feminist and activist (Camden)
 Frederick Eberhardt (1868–1946), engineer, philanthropist, university administrator and businessman (Newark)
 Randy Edelman (born 1947), film and TV score composer (Paterson)
 Frankie Edgar (born 1981), mixed martial artist (Toms River)
 Geoff Edwards (1931–2014), actor, radio and television personality (Westfield)
 Todd Edwards (born 1972), music producer (Bloomfield)
 Róisín Egenton (born 1977), 2000 International Rose of Tralee (Fanwood)
 Hallie Kate Eisenberg (born 1992), teen actress (East Brunswick)
Pablo Eisenberg (born 1932), scholar, social justice advocate, and tennis player
 Hy Eisman (born 1927), cartoonist, Katy Keene, Little Iodine, Katzenjammer Kids, Popeye (Paterson)
 Robert Ellenstein (1923–2010), actor (Newark)
 Linda Emond (born 1959), actress, Julie & Julia (New Brunswick)
 Alecko Eskandarian (born 1982), soccer player (Montvale)
 Janet Evanovich (born 1943), novelist (South River)
 Bill Evans (1929–1980), jazz pianist and composer (Plainfield)
 Josh Evans (born 1991), safety for the Jacksonville Jaguars (Irvington)
 Charles Evered (born 1964), writer, director (Passaic, grew up in Rutherford)
 Greg Evigan (born 1953), actor, B. J. and the Bear, My Two Dads (South Amboy)
 Donald Fagen (born 1948), musician (Steely Dan) (South Brunswick)
 Joseph Farah (born 1954), journalist and editor-in-chief of WorldNetDaily (Paterson)
 Tali Farhadian (born 1974/1975), former US federal prosecutor (Englewood Cliffs)
 Kenneth Faried (born 1989), power forward for the Denver Nuggets (Newark)
 Taissa Farmiga (born 1994), actress, American Horror Story, The Bling Ring (Readington)
 Vera Farmiga (born 1973), actress, The Departed, Up in the Air (Clifton)
 John Farrell (born 1962), manager for the Boston Red Sox (Monmouth Beach)
 Warren Farrell (born 1943), educator, gender equality activist and author
 Edward Feigenbaum (born 1936), computer scientist known as "the father of expert systems" (Weehawken)
 Fetty Wap, real name Willie Maxwell II (born 1991), singer, rapper (Paterson)
 Joan Field (1915–1988), violinist (Long Branch)
 Joe Fields (born 1953), NFL center, primarily with the New York Jets (Woodbury)
 Nic Fink (born 1993), Olympic swimmer (Morristown)
 Anthony Firkser (born 1995), football tight end for the Tennessee Titans of the National Football League
 Gail Fisher (1935–2000), actress, Mannix (Orange)
 Leo Fitzpatrick (born 1978), actor, Johnny Weeks on The Wire (West Orange)
 Joe Flacco (born 1985), quarterback for the Baltimore Ravens (Audubon)
 Harris Flanagin (1817–1874), 7th Governor of Arkansas
 Susan Flannery (born 1939), soap opera actress (Jersey City)
 Josh Flitter (born 1994), child actor (Ridgewood)
 Mary Florentine (born 1950), psychoacoustics researcher (Nutley)
 Richard Florida (born 1957), urban studies theorist, author of Who's Your City? (Newark)
 Jehyve Floyd (born 1997), basketball player in the Israeli Basketball Premier League
 Rick Folbaum (born 1969), news anchor and correspondent for Fox News (Cherry Hill)
 Dick Foran (1910–1979), Western film actor (Flemington)
 Malcolm Forbes (1919–1990), entrepreneur, publisher, New Jersey State Senator (Englewood/Far Hills)
 Steve Forbes (born 1947), editor-in-chief of Forbes magazine; president and CEO of Forbes, Inc. (Morristown)
 Darren Ford (born 1985), outfielder for the Pittsburgh Pirates (Vineland)
 Mike Ford (born 1992), first baseman for the New York Yankees (Belle Mead)
 Gerard J. Foschini (born 1940), telecommunications engineer (Jersey City)
 Preston Foster (1900–1970), actor (Ocean City)
 Beth Fowler (born 1940), actress, singer (Jersey City)
 Randy Foye (born 1983), shooting guard/point guard for the Utah Jazz (Newark)
 Connie Francis (born 1938), pop singer (Newark)
 Genie Francis (born 1962), actress, General Hospital (Englewood)
 Barney Frank (born 1940), openly gay Massachusetts member of Congress (Bayonne)
 Waldo Frank (1889–1967), novelist, historian, literary critic (Long Branch)
 Todd Frazier (born 1986), infielder for the New York Yankees, previously Cincinnati Reds, Chicago White Sox (Point Pleasant)
 Dean Friedman (born 1955), singer-songwriter (Paramus)
 Lennie Friedman (born 1976), NFL offensive lineman (Livingston)
 Chad Frye (born 1972), cartoonist and illustrator (Florham Park)
 Greg Fulginiti (born 1951), recording and mastering engineer (Wildwood)
 Melissa Fumero (born 1982), actress, Brooklyn Nine-Nine (North Bergen)

G–S 

 Alice Gainer (born 1982), anchorwoman for WCBS-TV (Wayne)
 Natasha Gajewski, founder of Symple Health (Princeton)
 Tony Galento (1910–1979), heavyweight boxer and actor, On the Waterfront (Orange)
 James Gandolfini (1961–2013), actor, starred in The Sopranos (Park Ridge)
 Antonio Garay (born 1979), defensive tackle for the San Diego Chargers (Rahway)
 Allen Garfield (1939–2020), actor (Newark)
 Lee Garlington (born 1953), actress (Teaneck)
 David Garrison (born 1952), actor, Married... with Children, It's Your Move (Long Branch)
 Willie Garson (born 1964), actor, Sex and the City (Highland Park)
 Bob Gaudio (born 1942), singer, songwriter, musician and record producer; keyboardist/backing vocalist for The Four Seasons
 Johnny Gaudreau (born 1993), ice hockey left winger for the Calgary Flames (Salem)
 Gloria Gaynor (born 1949), singer (Newark)
 Michael V. Gazzo (1923–1995), playwright and actor, Frank Pentangeli in The Godfather Part II (Hillside)
 Brian Geraghty (born 1974), actor (Toms River)
 Michael Giacchino (born 1967), Oscar-winning composer (Riverside, grew up in Edgewater Park)
 Elizabeth Gillies (born 1993), actress, singer, dancer (Haworth)
 Justin Gimelstob (born 1977), tennis player (Livingston)
 Allen Ginsberg (1926–1997), poet (Paterson)
 Bob Giraldi (born 1939), film, TV and music video director (Paterson)
 Kid Gleason (1866–1933), baseball player (Camden)
 Savion Glover (born 1973), actor, tap dancer and choreographer (Newark)
 Judy Gold (born 1962), stand-up comic (Newark)
 Al Golden (born 1969), head football coach for the University of Miami (Colts Neck)
 Joshua Gomez (born 1975), actor, Chuck, Without a Trace (Bayonne)
 Rick Gomez (born 1972), actor, Band of Brothers (Bayonne)
 Frances Goodrich (1890–1984), screenwriter, It's a Wonderful Life, The Thin Man (Belleville)
 Hedwig Gorski (born 1949), poet
 Goose Goslin (1900–1971), Hall of Fame baseball infielder (Salem)
 Dwayne Gratz (born 1990), cornerback for the Jacksonville Jaguars (Piscataway)
 Kerri Green (born 1967), actress (Fort Lee)
 Bob Greene (born 1958), fitness guru, author (Cherry Hill)
 Khaseem Greene (born 1989), linebacker for the Chicago Bears (Elizabeth)
 Peter Greene (born 1965), actor, Zed from Pulp Fiction (Montclair)
 Shonn Greene (born 1985), running back for the New York Jets (Sicklerville)
 Zach Grenier (born 1954), actor, Touching Evil (Englewood)
 Hezekiah Griggs, III (1988–2016), entrepreneur, philanthropist, investor
 Christina Grimmie (1994–2016), singer–songwriter, contestant on The Voice (Marlton)
 Robert Griswold (born 1996), swimmer
 Jay Gruen (born 1974), TV Host "Unplugged Nation" (Paterson)
 Dan Grunfeld (born 1984), professional basketball player (Franklin Lakes)
 Tom Guiry (born 1981), actor, The Black Donnellys (Trenton)
 Marvelous Marvin Hagler (1954–2021), boxer (Newark)
 Alison Haislip (born 1981), actress, TV correspondent, Attack of the Show!, The Voice, Battleground (Tewksbury Township)
 Halsey, real name Ashley Frangipane (born 1994), singer-songwriter (Edison)
 Rusty Hamer (1947–1990), child actor, Make Room for Daddy (Tenafly)
 David Hand (1900–1986), animator, director, Walt Disney Productions, Gaumont-British, Alexander Film Company (Plainfield)
 Chelsea Handler (born 1975), stand-up comedian, actress, host of Chelsea Lately (Livingston)
 Henry Janeway Hardenbergh (1847–1918), architect (New Brunswick)
 John Harkes (born 1967), soccer player (Kearny)
 Jess Harnell (born 1963), voice actor, Animaniacs, Up, the Transformers movies (Teaneck)
 Al Harrington (born 1980), player for the Orlando Magic (Orange)
 Ed Harris (born 1950), actor, Pollock, The Truman Show, The Right Stuff, Apollo 13, Game Change (born in Englewood, raised in Tenafly)
 Franco Harris (born 1950), Hall of Fame fullback with the Pittsburgh Steelers (Fort Dix)
 Roxanne Hart (born 1952), actress, Chicago Hope (Trenton)
 Dwayne Haskins (1997–2022), football player (Highland Park)
 Tobin Heath (born 1988), forward for the USWNT and Portland Thorns FC (Morristown)
 Robert Hegyes (1951–2012), actor, Welcome Back, Kotter (Perth Amboy)
 Grace Helbig (born 1985), actress, comedian, Camp Takota (Woodbury, raised in Woodbury Heights)
 Mark Helias (born 1950), jazz musician (New Brunswick)
 Gerald Henderson Jr. (born 1987), shooting guard for the Charlotte Bobcats (Caldwell)
 Al Herpin (1862–1947), insomniac (Trenton)
 Frank Herrmann (born 1984), relief pitcher for the Cleveland Indians (Rutherford)
 Robert Hess (1938–1994), President of Brooklyn College
 Jon-Erik Hexum (1957–1984), actor, model, Voyagers! (Englewood, raised in Tenafly)
 Richard X. Heyman (born 1951), singer-songwriter, musician, original member of The Doughboys (Plainfield)
 Shana Hiatt (born 1975), model, presenter (Tabernacle Township)
 Beatrice Hicks (1919–1979), engineer, co-founder, and first president of the Society of Women Engineers (Orange)
 Michele Hicks (born 1973), actress, Mara Vendrell on The Shield (Essex County)
 Brian Hill (born 1947), assistant coach for the Detroit Pistons (East Orange)
 Dulé Hill (born 1975), actor, Psych (East Brunswick, raised in Sayreville)
 Lauryn Hill (born 1975), singer, rapper, songwriter (South Orange)
 Garret Hobart (1844–1899), 24th Vice President of the United States (Long Branch)
 Chris Hogan (born 1988), wide receiver for the New England Patriots (Wyckoff)
 Jesse Holley (born 1984), wide receiver for the Dallas Cowboys (Roselle)
 Richard Hooker (1924–1997), writer, surgeon, author of the novel MASH (Trenton)
 Jermaine 'Huggy' Hopkins (born 1973), actor (Newark)
 Neil Hopkins (born 1977), actor (Trenton)
 Wil Horneff (born 1979), actor (born in Englewood, raised in Saddle River)
 Dennis Horner (born 1988), forward for the Artland Dragons (Linwood)
 Adam "Ad-Rock" Horovitz (born 1966), member of the Beastie Boys (South Orange)
 Cissy Houston (born 1933), singer (Newark)
 Whitney Houston (1963–2012), singer and actress (Newark, grew up in East Orange)
 Tim Howard (born 1979), soccer player (North Brunswick)
 Thomas Hutchins (1730–1789), military engineer, cartographer, geographer and surveyor (Monmouth County)
 Paul Iacono (born 1988), actor, stars in The Hard Times of RJ Berger (Secaucus)
 Frank Iero (born 1981), rhythm guitarist of My Chemical Romance (Belleville)
 Sonny Igoe (1923–2012), jazz and big band drummer (Jersey City)
 Mark Ingram II (born 1989), running back for the New Orleans Saints (Hackensack)
 Ryan Izzo (born 1995), tight end for the New England Patriots (Highland Lakes)
 Michael Jace (born 1965), actor, Officer Julien Lowe on The Shield (Paterson)
 Leonard Jeffries (born 1937), controversial professor of Black Studies at the City University of New York (Newark)
 Malcolm Jenkins (born 1987), safety for the Philadelphia Eagles (East Orange)
 Rodney Jerkins (born 1977), songwriter, record producer, musician (Pleasantville)

 Dontae Johnson (born 1991), cornerback for the San Francisco 49ers (Pennington)
 Enoch "Nucky" Johnson (1883–1968), Atlantic City political boss and racketeer, basis for Boardwalk Empire's Nucky Thompson (Galloway Township)
 James P. Johnson (1894–1955), stride jazz pianist (New Brunswick)
 J. Seward Johnson Jr. (1930–2020), sculptor
 Leavander Johnson (1969–2005), world champion boxer (Atlantic City) 
 Robert Wood Johnson II (1893–1968), businessman, Chairman of the Board of Johnson & Johnson (New Brunswick)
 Soterios Johnson, host on public radio station WNYC (Highland Park)
 Frankie Jonas (born 2000), child actor, Jonas (Ridgewood)

 Kevin Jonas (born 1987), singer, guitarist, member of the Jonas Brothers (Teaneck, raised in Wyckoff)

 Dahntay Jones (born 1980), player for the Indiana Pacers (Trenton, raised in Hamilton Square)
 Donald Jones (born 1987), wide receiver for the Buffalo Bills (Plainfield)
 Keith Jones (born 1985), broadcaster (New Egypt)
 Linda Jones (1944–1972), soul singer (Newark)
 Maxine Jones (born 1965), singer (Paterson)
 Michael Jones (born 1987), voice actor, actor, YouTube personality (Woodbridge)
 Nate Jones (born 1982), NFL cornerback (Newark)
 Ben Jorgensen (born 1983), musician (Teaneck)

 Just Blaze, rap musician (Paterson)
 Yaki Kadafi (1977–1996), rapper and member of Tupac Shakur's group Outlawz (Irvington)
 Jerome Kagan (1929–2021), pioneer in the field of developmental psychology (Newark)

 Herman Kahn (1922–1983), preeminent nuclear scientist of the 20th century from Bayonne
 Stanley Kamel (1943–2008), actor, Monk, Melrose Place (South River)
 Ira Kaplan, musician, co-founder of Yo La Tengo (Hoboken)
 Myq Kaplan (born 1978), stand-up comedian (Livingston)
 Eric Karros (born 1967), MLB first baseman, TV color commentator for (Hackensack)
 Danny Kass (born 1982), pro snowboarder (Vernon Valley)
 Thomas Kean (born 1935), governor, 9/11 Commission chairman (Bedminster)
 Brian Keith (1921–1997), actor, The Parent Trap, Nevada Smith, Family Affair, The Wind and the Lion (Bayonne)
 Daniel Hugh Kelly (born 1952), actor (Elizabeth)
 Mark Kelly (born 1964), astronaut, husband of Congresswoman Gabby Giffords, twin brother of Scott Kelly (Orange)
 Scott Kelly (born 1964), astronaut, Commander of International Space Station Expedition 26, twin brother of Mark Kelly (Orange)
 Victor J. Kemper (born 1927), cinematographer (Newark)
 Stacey Kent (born 1965), singer (South Orange)
 Walter Kidde (1877–1943), founder of the Kidde company (Hoboken)
 Tom Kiesche (born 1967), actor (Hackensack)
 Jim Kiick (1946–2020), NFL running back, primarily for the Miami Dolphins (Lincoln Park)
 Victor Kilian (1891–1979), actor (Jersey City)
 Joyce Kilmer (1886–1918), poet (New Brunswick)
 Zalman King (1941–2012), actor, director, writer, Body Language (Trenton)
 Alfred Kinsey (1894–1956), zoologist and sexologist (Hoboken)
 Michael E. Knight (born 1959), actor (Princeton)
 Ann McLaughlin Korologos (born 1941), Secretary of Labor from 1987 to 1989 (Chatham)
 Ernie Kovacs (1919–1962), comedian and actor (Trenton)
 Stephen Kovacs (1972–2022), saber fencer and fencing coach, charged with sexual assault, died in prison
 Dennis Kozlowski (born 1946), CEO of Tyco International, convicted in 2005 (Newark)
 Jane Krakowski (born 1969), actress, 30 Rock (Parsippany)
 Barbara Kruger (born 1945), conceptual artist (Newark)
 Larry Kudlow (born 1947), economist, TV personality, syndicated columnist (Englewood)
 Richard Kuklinski (1935–2006), murderer of over 100 people in mob-related instances (Jersey City)
 Jared Kushner (born 1981), Senior Advisor to President Donald Trump (Livingston)
 William Labov (born 1927), linguist (Rutherford)
 Christian Lambertsen (1917–2011), environmental medicine and diving medicine specialist (Westfield)
 Nathan Lane (born 1956), Tony Award-winning actor (Jersey City)
 Artie Lange (born 1967), actor, comedian, radio personality (Livingston, raised in Union)
 Frank Langella (born 1938), actor, Dracula, Superman Returns, Frost/Nixon, Draft Day (Bayonne)
 Mike Largey (born 1960), basketball player in the Israeli Basketball Premier League
 Tara LaRosa (born 1978), mixed martial artist (Woodstown)
 Ali Larter (born 1976), actress, Niki Sanders on Heroes (Cherry Hill)
 Vincent Larusso (born 1978), actor, The Mighty Ducks trilogy (Livingston)
 Jonathan Last (born 1974), author, senior writer at The Weekly Standard (born in Camden, raised in Woodbury and Moorestown)
 Tommy La Stella (born 1989), second baseman for the Chicago Cubs (Closter)
 Queen Latifah (born 1970), singer, actress, TV personality (Newark)
 Jack Lawless (born 1987), drummer of the Jonas Brothers (Middletown)
 Jacob Lawrence (1917–2000), artist (Atlantic City)
 Paul Le Mat (born 1946), actor, American Graffiti, Melvin and Howard (Rahway)
 Nicole Leach (born 1979), actress (Montclair)
 Fran Lebowitz (born 1950), author (Morristown)
 Beverly Lee (born 1941), singer with The Shirelles (Passaic)
 Al Leiter (born 1965), MLB starting pitcher, TV commentator (Toms River)
 Stephanie Lemelin (born 1979), actress, Young Justice (Sewell)
 Arthur Lenk (born 1964), Israeli diplomat (Paterson)
 Robert Sean Leonard (born 1969), actor, House, Dead Poets Society (born in Westwood, raised in Ridgewood)
 Michael Lerner (born 1943), left-wing activist and rabbi (Newark)
 Jerry Levine (born 1957), actor, director, Going Places, Will & Grace (New Brunswick)
 Diane Lewis (c. 1953–2007), journalist East Orange)
 Jerry Lewis (1926–2017), actor, comedian, director, telethon host, Academy Award honoree (Newark)
 Bob Ley (born 1955), ESPN sports anchor (Newark)
 Judith Light (born 1949), actress, Emmy Award winner, Who's the Boss?, Ugly Betty, Law & Order: SVU (Trenton)
 Damon Lindelof (born 1973), television and film producer, Lost, Crossing Jordan, Star Trek (Teaneck)
 Ray Liotta (1955–2022), actor, Goodfellas, The Rat Pack, Cop Land, Hannibal (born in Newark, raised in Union Township)
 Sean Lissemore (born 1987), defensive end for the Dallas Cowboys (Teaneck)
 Carli Lloyd (born 1982), Soccer Player, two-time FIFA Women World Player of the Year, two-time Olympic gold medalist, FIFA Women's World Cup gold and silver medalist, plays for the United States women's national soccer team (Delran Township)
 Norman Lloyd (1914–2021), actor, director, producer, St. Elsewhere (Jersey City)
 Amy Locane (born 1971), actress (Trenton)
 Kurt Loder (born 1945), film critic, author, columnist, TV personality (Ocean City)
 Jim Lord (born 1948), singer-songwriter
 Faizon Love (born 1968), actor (Newark)
 Derek Luke (born 1974), actor (Jersey City)
 Martha MacCallum (born 1964), news anchor for the Fox News Channel (Wyckoff)
 Bob MacDonald (born 1965), MLB pitcher (East Orange)
 Elliott Maddox (born 1947), Major League Baseball player (East Orange)
 Leonard Maltin (born 1950), film critic, film historian, author (Teaneck)
 Steve Maneri (born 1988), tight end for the Chicago Bears (Saddle Brook)
 Greg Mankiw (born 1958), macroeconomist and chairman of the Council of Economic Advisers under President George W. Bush (Trenton)
 David Marciano (born 1960), actor (Newark)
 Bernie Marcus (born 1929), founder and first CEO of The Home Depot (Newark)
 Lisa Marie (born 1968), model and actress (Piscataway)
 John Marin (1870–1953), artist (Rutherford)
 Robert Markowitz (born 1935), film and TV director (Irvington)
 Marc Maron (born 1963), stand-up comedian (Jersey City)

 George R. R. Martin (born 1948), novelist, short story writer, author of A Song of Ice and Fire (Bayonne)
 Soraida Martinez (born 1956), artist, designer and social activist known for creating the art style of Verdadism.[198]
 Nick Massi (1927–2000), bass singer and bass guitarist for The Four Seasons (Newark)
 Ronald F. Maxwell (born 1949), film director, screenwriter (Clifton)
 Vin Mazzaro (born 1986), relief pitcher for the Pittsburgh Pirates (Hackensack, raised in Rutherford)
 Matt McAndrew (born 1990), singer-songwriter, contestant from The Voice season 7 (Barnegat Light)
 Turk McBride (born 1985), defensive end for the New Orleans Saints (Camden)
 Andrew McCarthy (born 1962), actor, Less than Zero, Pretty in Pink, Weekend at Bernie's (Westfield)
 Beth McCarthy-Miller (born 1963), TV director, Saturday Night Live, 30 Rock, The Marriage Ref (Elizabeth)
 Tom McCarthy (born 1966), actor, writer, director, Scott Templeton on The Wire (New Providence)
 Heather McComb (born 1977), actor, Profiler, Party of Five (Barnegat Township)
 Mary McCormack (born 1969), actress, In Plain Sight, The West Wing, Murder One (Plainfield)
 Warren Sturgis McCulloch (1898–1969), neurophysiologist and cybernetician (Orange)
 Don McGahn (born 1968), White House Counsel to President Donald Trump (Atlantic City)
 Tom McGowan (born 1959), actor, Frasier, Down the Shore, Everybody Loves Raymond (Belmar)
 Kareem McKenzie (born 1979), former offensive tackle for the New York Giants (Trenton)

 Bryant McKinnie (born 1979), offensive tackle for the Baltimore Ravens (Woodbury)
 Christopher McQuarrie (born 1968), Academy Award-winning screenwriter, director (Princeton Junction)
 Joe Medwick (1911–1975), Hall of Fame baseball player (Carteret)
 George Mehnert (1881–1948), freestyle wrestler, two-time Olympic gold medalist (Newark)
 Tony Meola (born 1969), soccer player (Kearny)
 Lee Meredith (born 1947), actress, The Producers (River Edge)
 Frank Messina (born 1968), poet
 Otto Messmer (1892–1983), animator, co-created Felix the Cat (Union City)
 Jason Mewes (born 1974), actor, Clerks, Mallrats, Chasing Amy, Dogma (Highlands)
 Dan Meyer (born 1981), relief pitcher for the Pittsburgh Pirates (Woodbury)
 Jeromy Miles (born 1987), safety for the Baltimore Ravens (Voorhees)
 Cristin Milioti (born 1985), actress, How I Met Your Mother, Fargo, The Wolf of Wall Street (Cherry Hill)
 Bea Miller (born 1999), singer (Maplewood)
 E. Spencer Miller (1817–1879), Dean of the University of Pennsylvania Law School (Princeton)
 Ezra Miller (born 1992), actor (Wyckoff)
 John Milnor (born 1931), mathematician, notable in the fields of exotic spheres and mathematical economics (Orange)
 Kelly Jo Minter (born 1966), actress (Trenton)
 Susan Misner (born 1971), actress (Paterson, grew up in Pequannock Township)
 Dorian Missick (born 1976), actor (East Orange)
 Thomas Mitchell (1892–1962), Oscar-winning actor (Elizabeth)
 Jay Mohr (born 1970), actor, comedian, radio personality (Verona)
 Frank Molinaro (born 1988), freestyle wrestler for the USA Olympics (Middletown)
 Steve Monarque (born 1959), actor, Friday the 13th: The Series (Pompton Lakes)
 Raymond Rocco Monto (born 1960), orthopedic surgeon, researcher (Newark, New Jersey)
 Eugene Monroe (born 1987), offensive tackle for the Baltimore Ravens (Plainfield)
 John J. Mooney (1930–2020), chemical engineer, co-inventor of the three-way catalytic converter (Paterson)
 Trevor Moore (1980–2021), actor, comedian, writer, The Whitest Kids U' Know (Montclair)
 Brit Morgan (born 1987), actress, True Blood, The Middleman (Marlton)
 Liv Morgan (born 1994) WWE wrestler (Elmwood Park)
 Knowshon Moreno (born 1987), professional football player (Middletown Township)
 Dezman Moses (born 1989), linebacker for the Kansas City Chiefs (Willingboro)
 Kevin Mulvey (born 1985), MLB starting pitcher (Parlin)
 Xavier Munford (born 1992), basketball player for Hapoel Tel Aviv of the Israeli Basketball Premier League
 Frankie Muniz (born 1985), actor, Malcolm in the Middle (Wood-Ridge)
 Ed Murawinski (born 1951), artist, New York Daily News (Jersey City)
 Eric Murdock (born 1968), professional basketball player (Somerville)
 Joseph S. Murphy (1933–1998), President of Queens College, President of Bennington College, and Chancellor of the City University of New York
 Troy Murphy (born 1980), power forward and center for the Los Angeles Lakers (Morristown)
 Tom Murro (born 1966), journalist, columnist, TV personality (Franklin Lakes)
 Ira B. Nadel (born 1943), biographer, literary critic
 Vince Naimoli (1937–2019), owner of the Tampa Bay Rays (Paterson)
 Andrew Napolitano (born 1950), Fox News Channel analyst, author, talk radio host (Newark)
 Naturi Naughton (born 1984), singer and actress (East Orange)
 Ozzie Nelson (1906–1975), actor, bandleader and TV personality (born in Jersey City, raised in Ridgefield Park)
 Ricky Nelson (1940–1985), singer and actor (Teaneck)
 Bebe Neuwirth (born 1958), Tony Award-winning actress (Princeton)
 David Newsom (born 1962), actor, photographer, Homefront (North Caldwell)
 Rebecca S. Nichols (1819-1903), poet (Greenwich)
 Jack Nicholson (born 1937), Oscar-winning actor (Neptune City)
 Kathleen Noone (born 1945), Emmy-winning actress, Sunset Beach, Knots Landing, All My Children (Hillsdale)
 Jeffrey Nordling (born 1962), actor, Once and Again, 24, Dirt (born in Ridgewood, raised in Washington Township)
 Jim Norton (born 1968), comedian, radio personality, actor, author (Bayonne)
 Joseph Nye (born 1937), international relations scholar and co-founder of the neoliberalism school of thought (South Orange)
 Imani Oakley (born 1990), 2022 candidate for Congress in New Jersey's 10th congressional district in the U.S. House of Representatives, former legislative director for New Jersey branch of the Working Families Party and political organizer (Montclair, New Jersey)
 Liam O'Brien (born 1976), voice actor, Monster, Ghost in the Shell (Weehawken)
 Daniel Och (born 1961), chairman and CEO of Och-Ziff Capital Management Group (Maplewood)

 Jodi Lyn O'Keefe (born 1978), actress (Cliffwood Beach)
 Criss Oliva (1963–1993), lead guitarist for metal band Savatage (Pompton Plains)
 Greg Olsen (born 1985), tight end for the Carolina Panthers (Wayne)
 T. J. O'Malley (1915–2009), aerospace engineer (Montclair)
 Henry O'Neill (1891–1961), actor (Orange)
 Jerry Only (born 1959), musician, bassist for The Misfits (Lodi)
 Peter Onorati (born 1954), actor, Civil Wars, Joe's Life, Cop Rock (Boonton)
 Heather O'Reilly (born 1985), three-time Olympic gold medalist and professional soccer player (East Brunswick)
 Claudette Ortiz (born 1981), R&B and Hip-Hop singer (Willingboro)
 David Packer (born 1962), actor (Passaic)
 John Panelli (1926–2012), NFL linebacker and running back (Morristown)
 Franklin Pangborn (1889–1958), character actor (Newark)
 Joe Pantoliano (born 1951), actor, The Matrix, Memento, The Fugitive, Bound, The Sopranos (Hoboken)
 Tom Papa (born 1968), comedian, actor, and writer (Passaic, raised in Woodcliff Lake)
 Bill Parcells (born 1941), NFL coach and Hall of Famer, TV commentator (Englewood)
 Robert Pastorelli (1954–2004), actor, Murphy Brown, Cracker, Eraser (New Brunswick)
 Alice Paul (1885–1977), suffragist (Mount Laurel)
 Elizabeth Peña (1959–2014), actress, The Incredibles, Rush Hour (Elizabeth)
 Irving Penn (1917–2009), photographer (Plainfield)
 Kal Penn (born 1977), actor (Montclair)
 Caroline Pennell (born 1996), singer-songwriter, contestant from The Voice season 5 (Saddle River)
 Jabrill Peppers (born 1995), strong safety and return specialist for the New York Giants (East Orange)
 Fernando Perez (born 1983), former MLB outfielder, baseball analyst for MLB.com (Elizabeth, raised in West Windsor)
 Millie Perkins (born 1938), actress (Passaic, raised in Fair Lawn)
 Jim Perry (1933–2015), U.S. and Canadian game show host (Camden)
 Joe Pesci (born 1943), Oscar-winning actor, Goodfellas, Raging Bull, Casino, JFK, Home Alone (Newark)
 Ralph Peterson Jr. (1962–2021), jazz drummer and bandleader (Pleasantville)
 Thomas R. Pickering (born 1931), diplomat (Orange)
 Jimmy Pinchak (born 1996), teen actor, Family Affair (Point Pleasant)
 Gregory Pincus (1903–1967), biologist and researcher who co-invented the combined oral contraceptive pill (Woodbine)
 Danny Pintauro (born 1976), actor, Who's the Boss? (Milltown)
 Joe Piscopo (born 1951), actor and comedian, Saturday Night Live, Wise Guys, 100 Deeds for Eddie McDowd (Passaic)
 Mahlon Pitney (1858–1924), U.S. Supreme Court justice (Morristown)
 Michael Pitt (born 1981), actor, Dawson's Creek, Boardwalk Empire, The Village (West Orange)
 Michael J. Pollard (1939–2019), actor, Bonnie and Clyde (Passaic)
 Rick Porcello (born 1988), starting pitcher for the Boston Red Sox (Morristown)
 Laura Prepon (born 1980), actress (Watchung)
 Molly Price (born 1966), actress (North Plainfield)
 Lou Taylor Pucci (born 1985), actor (Seaside Heights, raised in Keansburg)
 Keshia Knight Pulliam (born 1979), actress, The Cosby Show (Newark)
 Charlie Puth (born 1991), singer (Rumson)
 Matthew Quick (born 1973), author of young adult and fiction novels (Oaklyn)
 Phil Radford (born 1976), Greenpeace Executive Director (New Brunswick)
 Rah Digga (born 1970), rap musician (Newark)
 Ronald T. Raines (born 1958), scientist, educator, and entrepreneur (Montclair)
 Bill Raisch (1905-1984), actor, One-Armed Man on The Fugitive (North Bergen) 
 Anthony Ranaudo (born 1989), pitcher for the Texas Rangers (Freehold Township)
 Melissa Rauch (born 1980), actress, comedian, Bernadette Rostenkowski on The Big Bang Theory (Marlboro)
 Nate Ravitz (born 1987), radio personality, Fantasy Focus (Brick)
 Redman (born 1970), rap musician (Newark)
 Isaac Redman (born 1984), running back for the Pittsburgh Steelers (Paulsboro)
 Melissa Reeves (born 1967), soap opera actress, Days of Our Lives, Santa Barbara (Eatontown)
 Tara Reid (born 1975), actress, American Pie, American Pie 2, American Reunion (Wyckoff)
 Juliette Reilly (born 1993), singer-songwriter and YouTuber (Berkeley Heights)
 Claudio Reyna (born 1973), soccer player (Livingston)
 Herb Rich (1928–2008), two-time All-Pro NFL football player
 Nelson Riddle (1921–1985), arranger, composer, bandleader and orchestrator (Oradell, raised in Ridgewood)
 Jesse Ridgway (born 1992) YouTuber better known as McJuggerNuggets (Elmer)
 Jim Ringo (1931–2007), NFL Hall of Fame center and head coach (Orange)
 Kelly Ripa (born 1970), actress and television personality (Berlin)
 Paul Robeson (1898–1976), singer, actor, Civil Rights Movement activist (Princeton)
 Buddy Rogers (1921–1992), pro wrestler and the first ever WWE champion (Camden)
 Emma Winner Rogers (1855-1922), writer, suffragist (Plainfield)

 Seth Roland (born 1957), soccer player and coach
 James Rolfe (born 1980), filmmaker and internet personality, star and creator of the Angry Video Game Nerd web series (Haddonfield)
 Danielle Rose Russell (born 1999), actress, Hope Mikaelson in Legacies (Pequannock Township, raised in West Milford)
 Alan Rosenberg (born 1950), actor, Cybill, The Guardian, Civil Wars (Passaic)
 Jeff Ross (born 1965), comedian (Springfield)
 Wilbur Ross (born 1937), U.S. Secretary of Commerce under President Donald Trump (Weehawken)
 Giuseppe Rossi (born 1987), soccer player (Teaneck)
 Philip Roth (1933–2018), author (Newark)
 Joan Roughgarden (born 1946), ecologist and evolutionary biologist (Paterson)
 Richard Ruccolo (born 1972), actor, Two Guys and a Girl, Rita Rocks (Marlton)
 Mark Rudd (born 1947), left-wing activist, founding member of the Weather Underground (Maplewood)
 Paul Rudd (born 1969), actor, Clueless (Passaic)
 Tom Ruegger (born 1956), producer, creator of The Animaniacs (Metuchen)
 Deborah Rush (born 1954), actress, Strangers with Candy, Family Business, You've Got Mail (Chatham)
 Bob Ryan (born 1946), sportswriter (Trenton)
 Bobby Ryan (born 1987), ice hockey winger for the Ottawa Senators (Cherry Hill)
 Logan Ryan (born 1991), cornerback for the New England Patriots (Berlin)
Peter Sagal (born 1965), NPR host (born and raised Berkeley Heights)
Katie Sagona (born 1989), actress (Westwood)
Eva Marie Saint (born 1924), Academy Award-winning actress (Newark)
Richie Sambora (born 1959), guitarist for rock band Bon Jovi (Perth Amboy, raised in Woodbridge Township)
Ajai Sanders (born 1967), actress, A Different World (Trenton)
Laura San Giacomo (born 1962), actress, Just Shoot Me! (Denville)
Caitlin Sanchez (born 1996), actress (Englewood)
Hector Santiago (born 1987), pitcher for the Los Angeles Angels (Newark)
Mohamed Sanu (born 1989), wide receiver for the Atlanta Falcons (Sayreville, raised in Dayton)
Dick Savitt (born 1927), tennis player, ranked No. 2 in the world in 1951 (Bayonne)

Natalie Schafer (1900–1991), actress, Mrs. Howell on Gilligan's Island (Red Bank)
Tom Scharpling (born 1969), comedian (Newbridge)
Roy Scheider (1932–2008), actor, Jaws, The French Connection, All That Jazz (Orange)
Greg Schiano (born 1966), head coach Tampa Bay Buccaneers, former head football coach Rutgers University (Wyckoff)
Wally Schirra (1923–2007), Navy officer and test pilot (Hackensack)
Sarah Schkeeper (born 1981), guard for the New York Sharks (Livingston)
Steve Schmidt (born 1970), campaign strategist and advisor to the 2008 presidential campaign of Senator John McCain (North Plainfield)
Scott Schoeneweis (born 1973), former MLB relief pitcher (Long Branch, raised in Mount Laurel)
Frank D. Schroth (1884–1974), publisher of the Brooklyn Eagle (Trenton)
Thomas N. Schroth (1920–2009), journalist, specializing in Inside the Beltway politics (Trenton)
Norton Schwartz (born 1951), US Air Force general and Chief of Staff of the United States Air Force (Toms River)
Sherwood Schwartz (1916–2011), television producer (Passaic)
Norman Schwarzkopf Jr. (1934–2012), U.S. general, led coalition forces in the Gulf War (Trenton)
Rusty Schweickart (born 1935), aeronautical engineer, NASA astronaut, research scientist (Neptune)
Patti Scialfa (born 1953), singer-songwriter, musician, member of the E Street Band (Deal)
Debralee Scott (1953–2005), actress, Angie (Elizabeth)
Doc Searls (born 1947), journalist, columnist, blogger, author (Jersey City)
Henry Selick (born 1952), stop motion director, producer, writer, The Nightmare Before Christmas, James and the Giant Peach, Coraline (Glen Ridge, raised in Rumson)
Ivan Sergei (born 1971), actor, Jack & Jill, Once a Thief, Crossing Jordan (Hawthorne)
Matt Servitto (born 1965), actor, Agent Harris on The Sopranos (Teaneck)
Marc Shaiman (born 1959), composer, lyricist, arranger, and performer (Newark)
Christian Sharps (1810–1874), inventor of first successful breech-loading rifle (Washington)
Ed Shaughnessy (1929–2013), swing and bebop drummer best known for his 29 years on The Tonight Show Starring Johnny Carson (Jersey City)
Duncan Sheik (born 1969), singer-songwriter and composer (Montclair)
Cindy Sherman (born 1954), artist and photographer (Glen Ridge)
Jonathan Marc Sherman (born 1968), playwright (Morristown, grew up in Livingston)
Sheetal Sheth (born 1976), actress (Phillipsburg)
Armin Shimerman (born 1949), actor, Star Trek: DS9, Buffy the Vampire Slayer, Beauty and the Beast (Lakewood)
Everett Shinn (1876–1953), artist (Woodstown)
David K. Shipler (born 1942), author (Chatham)
The Shirelles, iconic and seminal girl group of the 1960s and 1970s (Passaic)
Joseph Shivers (1920–2014), textile chemist (Marlton)
Michael Showalter (born 1970), actor/comedian (Princeton)
Joel Silver (born 1952), film and television producer, the Matrix Trilogy, the Lethal Weapon movies, Die Hard, Predator (South Orange)
Bill Simon (born 1951), businessman, California politician (Neptune Township)
Jimmi Simpson (born 1975), actor, House of Cards, Westworld, Date Night (Hackettstown)
Frank Sinatra (1915–1998), iconic singer and Academy Award-winning actor (Hoboken)
Frank Sinatra Jr. (1944–2016), singer, songwriter, conductor (Jersey City)
Nancy Sinatra (born 1940), singer, actress (Jersey City)
Tony Siragusa (born 1967), football player and TV commentator (Kenilworth)
Jeremy Slate (1926–2006), actor (Atlantic City)
Devin Smeltzer (born 1995), starting pitcher for the Minnesota Twins (Voorhees)
Jennifer Schwalbach Smith (born 1971), actress (Newark)
J. R. Smith (born 1985), shooting guard for the New York Knicks (Freehold)
Kevin Smith (born 1970), filmmaker, Clerks, Dogma, Red State (Highlands)
Tasha Smith (born 1971), actress, Boston Common, Tyler Perry's For Better or Worse (Camden)
Chris Snee (born 1982), guard for the New York Giants (Edison)
Jason Snelling (born 1983), running back for the Atlanta Falcons (Toms River)
Todd Solondz (born 1959), filmmaker (Newark)
Soraya (1969–2006), singer–songwriter (Point Pleasant)
Mira Sorvino (born 1967), Oscar-winning actress (Tenafly)
Arthur Space (1908–1983), actor, Lassie (New Brunswick)
Charles Speziale (1948–1999), scientist who had worked in Langley Research Center (Newark)
Bruce Springsteen (born 1949), iconic singer-songwriter (Long Branch, raised in Freehold)
Pamela Springsteen (born 1962), actress and photographer (Freehold)
Amos Alonzo Stagg (1862–1965), athlete and pioneering college coach in multiple sports, primarily football (West Orange)
Cody Stashak (born 1994), relief pitcher for the Minnesota Twins (Somers Point)
Mark Stein (born 1947), rock musician, composer, and arranger (Bayonne)
Victor J. Stenger (1935–2014), particle physicist, atheist, author (Bayonne)
Mindy Sterling (born 1953), actress, Frau Farbissina in the Austin Powers movies (Paterson)
Robert Sternberg (born 1949), psychologist and psychometrician (Newark)
Martha Stewart (born 1941), lifestyle guide, entrepreneur, TV personality (Jersey City, grew up in Nutley)
Alfred Stieglitz (1864–1946), photographer (Hoboken)
Rod Streater (born 1988), wide receiver for the Oakland Raiders (Burlington)
Meryl Streep (born 1949), Academy Award-winning actress (Summit)
Julian M. Sturtevant (1908-2005), professor of biochemistry, Yale University
William Graham Sumner (1840–1910), prominent sociologist, educator, academic (Paterson)
Josh Sussman (born 1983), actor, Glee, Warren the Ape (Teaneck)
Loretta Swit (born 1937), actress, Margaret Houlihan on M*A*S*H (Passaic)
Tammy Lynn Sytch (born 1972), professional wrestling valet (Fort Monmouth)

T–Z 

Michael Taccetta (born 1947), high-ranking member of the Lucchese crime family (Newark)
Julian Talley (born 1989), wide receiver for the New York Giants (Stratford)
Danny Tamberelli (born 1982), actor (Wyckoff)
Kathryn Tappen (born 1981), NBC sportscaster (Morristown)
Glenn Taranto (born 1959), actor, Gomez in The New Addams Family (Hackensack)
Frank Tashlin (1913–1972), animator, screenwriter, and film director (Weehawken)
Giselle Tavera (born 1993), singer (Cherry Hill)
John Taylor (1836–1909), businessman, politician, creator of Taylor brand pork roll
 Eileen Tell (born 1966), tennis player
Jon Tenney (born 1961), actor, The Closer, Get Real, Scandal (Princeton)
Jack Terricloth (1970–2021), lead singer of The World/Inferno Friendship Society (Bridgewater)
Joe Theismann (born 1949), quarterback for Notre Dame and the Washington Redskins, TV color commentator (New Brunswick, raised in South River)
Tim Thomas (born 1977), NBA forward (Paterson)
Jason Thompson (born 1986), forward and center for the Sacramento Kings (Mount Laurel)
Steve Tisch (born 1949), chairman and executive vice president for the New York Giants; also a film and television producer (Lakewood)
Ashley Tisdale (born 1985), actress, High School Musical, The Suite Life of Zack and Cody, Phineas and Ferb and singer (Ocean Township)
Ray Toro (born 1977), lead guitarist of My Chemical Romance (Kearny)
Karl-Anthony Towns (born 1995), NBA player (Edison)
Justin Trattou (born 1988), defensive end for the Minnesota Vikings (Maywood)
Ellen Travolta (born 1940), actress, Charles in Charge, Joanie Loves Chachi (Englewood)
John Travolta (born 1954), actor, Saturday Night Fever, Grease, Pulp Fiction (Englewood)
Linda Tripp (1949–2020), central figure in Clinton–Lewinsky scandal of 1998 and 1999 (Jersey City)
Mike Trout (born 1991), outfielder for the Los Angeles Angels (Millville)
Martin Truex Jr. (born 1980), NASCAR driver (Englishtown)
Eddie Trunk (born 1964), music historian, radio personality, author (Madison)
Louise Tunison (1872–1899), composer
Rahshon Turner (born 1975), basketball player
David Tyree (born 1980), former NFL wide receiver and special teamer, primarily with the New York Giants (Livingston, raised in Montclair)
Laura Tyson (born 1947), economist, Director of the National Economic Council under Bill Clinton (Bayonne)
Tiquan Underwood (born 1987), wide receiver for the New England Patriots (North Brunswick)
James Urbaniak (born 1963), actor, voice actor, The Venture Bros. (Bayonne)
Michael Uslan, producer of the Batman movies (born in Bayonne, has lived in Cedar Grove)
Alfred Vail (1807–1859), machinist, inventor, helped develop and commercialize the telegraph (Morristown)
Buddy Valastro (born 1977), reality television star, Cake Boss (Hoboken)
Frankie Valli (born 1934), lead singer, The Four Seasons (Newark)
Lee Van Cleef (1925–1989), actor, The Good, the Bad and the Ugly, The Man Who Shot Liberty Valance, Escape from New York (Somerville)
Rudy Van Gelder (1924–2016), Blue Note Records recording engineer (Jersey City)
Jeff Van Note (born 1946), center for the Atlanta Falcons (South Orange)
James Van Riemsdyk (born 1989), NHL player (Middletown)
Johnny Vander Meer (1918–1997), baseball pitcher who threw two consecutive no-hitters for Reds in 1938 (Prospect Park)
Sarah Vaughan (1924–1990), singer (Newark)
Tom Verducci, sportswriter for Sports Illustrated and si.com, commentator MLB Tonight (East Orange, raised in Glen Ridge)
Tom Verlaine (born 1949), television guitarist (Denville)
Alex Vincent (born 1981), child actor (Newark, raised in Maywood)
Dick Vitale (born 1939), sportscaster (Passaic)
Vitamin C (born 1969), pop singer (Old Bridge Township)
Floyd Vivino (born 1951), actor (Paterson)
Frank Vogel (born 1973), head coach for the Indiana Pacers (Wildwood)
Paul Volcker (1927–2019), economist, chairman of the Economic Recovery Advisory Board under President Barack Obama (Cape May, raised in Teaneck)
Frederica Von Stade (born 1945), operatic mezzo-soprano (Somerville)
Rich Vos (born 1957), stand-up comic (Plainfield)
Jersey Joe Walcott (1914–1994), heavyweight champion (Merchantville, New Jersey)
Tracey Walter (born 1947), character actor (Jersey City)
Patrick Warburton (born 1964), actor (Paterson)
Travis Warech (born 1991), American-German-Israeli basketball player for Israeli team Hapoel Be'er Sheva
Malcolm Jamal Warner (born 1970), actor (Jersey City)
Dionne Warwick (born 1940), R&B singer, actress (East Orange)
Rebecca Watson (born 1980), skeptical blogger and podcast host who founded the Skepchick blog
Vernee Watson-Johnson (born 1954), actress (Trenton)
Gerard Way (born 1977), lead singer of My Chemical Romance (Summit)
Mikey Way (born 1980), bass guitarist of My Chemical Romance (Newark)
Charlie Weis (born 1956), head football coach for University of Kansas (Middlesex)
Shaun Weiss (born 1978), actor, The Mighty Ducks movies (Montvale)
 Spencer Weisz (born 1995), American-Israeli professional basketball player for Hapoel Haifa of the Israeli Basketball Premier League
Paul Wesley (born 1982), actor in The Vampire Diaries, from (New Brunswick), grew up in (Marlboro)
David West (born 1980), power forward for the Indiana Pacers (Teaneck)
Stylez G. White (born 1979), NFL defensive end (Newark)
Tahir Whitehead (born 1990), linebacker for the Detroit Lions (Jersey City, raised in Newark)
Muhammad Wilkerson (born 1989), Defensive end for the New York Jets (Linden, New Jersey)
C. K. Williams (1936–2015), poet, critic and translator (Newark)
Gary Williams (born 1945), basketball coach for University of Maryland, current Big Ten Network analyst (Collingswood)
J. D. Williams (born 1981), actor (Newark)
Malinda Williams (born 1975), actress, Tracy "Bird" Van Adams on Soul Food (Elizabeth, raised in Westfield)
Nick Williams (born 1990), wide receiver for the Atlanta Falcons (Hightstown, raised in East Windsor)
Wendy Williams, radio and TV personality (born in Asbury Park, grew up in Ocean Township)
Flip Wilson (1933–1998), comedian and actor (Jersey City)
Frank Winters (born 1964), NFL center, primarily for the Green Bay Packers (Hoboken)
Henry Wittenberg (1918–2010), freestyle wrestler, Olympic champion, two-time Olympic medalist (Jersey City)
Alex Wojciechowicz (1915–1992), Hall of Fame NFL center and linebacker (South River)
Sam Woodyard (1925–1988), big band drummer with Duke Ellington and others (Elizabeth)
Beulah Woolston (1828-1886), teacher, translator, editor (Vincentown)
Corey Wootton (born 1987), defensive end for the Chicago Bears (Rutherford)
Jason Worilds (born 1988), outside linebacker for the Pittsburgh Steelers (Rahway, raised in Carteret)
Bernie Worrell (1944–2016), keyboards, Parliament-Funkadelic, Talking Heads (Long Branch/Clinton)
Chris Wragge (born 1970), sports journalist and presenter for WCBS-TV (Hackensack)
Kelly Wright (born 1987), artist, radio host on WPIR Pratt Radio (Maywood)
Robert Wuhl (born 1951), actor, writer, comedian, Batman, Cobb, Arliss (Union)
Chris Wylde (born 1976), actor, comedian, Strip Mall (Hackettstown)
Zakk Wylde (born 1967), guitarist for Ozzy Osbourne and Black Label Society (Bayonne, raised in Jackson Township)
Emmanuel Yarborough (1964–2015), amateur sumo wrestler, mixed martial arts competitor (Rahway)
Aaron Yoo (born 1979), actor, Disturbia (East Brunswick)
Albert Young (born 1985), running back for the Pittsburgh Steelers (Moorestown)
Karen Young (born 1958), actress, Agent Robyn Sanseverino on The Sopranos (Pequannock)
Larry Young (1940–1978), hard bop jazz organist (Newark)
David Zabriskie (born 1986), retired amateur wrestler and current wrestling coach (Branchville)
Pia Zadora (born 1954), actress and singer (Hoboken)
Stuart Zagnit (born 1952), actor (New Brunswick)
Rachel Zegler (born 2001), actress, West Side Story (Hackensack)
Jackie Zeman (born 1967), actress, General Hospital (Englewood) 
Ian Ziering (born 1964), actor, Beverly Hills, 90210 (Newark, raised in West Orange)
Vanessa Zima (born 1986), actress (Phillipsburg)
Yvonne Zima (born 1989), actress, The Young and the Restless, ER (Phillipsburg)
Jeremy Zuttah (born 1986), offensive lineman for the Baltimore Ravens (Edison)
Abner Zwillman, Jewish American mob boss (Newark)

Born in New Jersey, raised elsewhere

Jack Abramoff (born 1958), former lobbyist and businessman convicted of fraud, conspiracy, and tax evasion (Atlantic City, moved to Beverly Hills, California, at age 9)
 Lavoy Allen (born 1989), power forward for the Philadelphia 76ers (Trenton, moved to Pennsylvania)
 Jozy Altidore (born 1989), soccer player (Livingston, raised in Boca Raton, Florida)
 Priscilla Barnes (born 1955), actress, Terri Alden on Three's Company (Fort Dix, raised in California)
 Jeffrey Bewkes (born 1952), CEO and Chairman of Time Warner (Paterson, raised in Darien, Connecticut)
 Robert Blake (born 1933), actor, Baretta (born in Nutley, raised in Los Angeles)
 Elizabeth Bogush (born 1977), actress, Titans (Perth Amboy, raised in Pittsburgh, Pennsylvania, and Hingham, Massachusetts)
 Phil Bredesen (born 1943), Governor of Tennessee (Oceanport, grew up in different parts of the country)
 Marshon Brooks (born 1989), player with the New Jersey Nets (Long Branch, raised in Tucker, Georgia)
 Michael R. Burns (born 1958), Vice Chairman of Lions Gate Entertainment (born in Long Branch, raised in New Canaan, Connecticut)
 Mary Chapin Carpenter (born 1958), Grammy-winning folk and country singer (born in Princeton; moved to Japan, then Washington, D.C.)
 Sean Casey (born 1974), former MLB All-Star first baseman, current color commentator for the Cincinnati Reds (Willingboro, moved to Pittsburgh)
 Paul Cushing Child (1902–1994), husband of celebrity chef Julia Child (Montclair, raised in Boston)
 Grover Cleveland (1837–1908), 22nd and 24th President of the United States (Caldwell, raised in western New York)
 Jason Cook (born 1980), actor, Days of Our Lives, General Hospital (Somerdale, raised in California)
 James Fenimore Cooper (1789–1851), writer (Burlington, raised in Cooperstown)
 Brian De Palma (born 1940), film director (born in Newark, raised in Philadelphia and New Hampshire)
 Brian Delate (born 1949), actor (Trenton, raised in Bucks County, Pennsylvania)
 Kirsten Dunst (born 1982), actress, Mary Jane Watson in the Spider-Man trilogy (Point Pleasant, raised in Los Angeles)
 Sylvia Earle (born 1935), marine biologist, explorer, author (Gibbstown, raised in Florida)
 Eric Ebron (born 1993), tight end for the Detroit Lions (Newark, moved to North Carolina)
Mel Ferrer (1917–2008), actor, director, Falcon Crest (Elberon, raised in New York and Connecticut)
 John Forsythe (1918–2010), actor, Dynasty, Charlie's Angels, Bachelor Father (Penns Grove, raised in Brooklyn, New York)
 Kate French (born 1985), actress, Wicked Wicked Games, The L Word (Flemington, raised in Long Island, New York)
 Kevin Friedland (born 1981), soccer player
 Dana Fuchs (born 1976), singer/songwriter (born in New Jersey, raised in Wildwood, Florida)
Janeane Garofalo (born 1964), comedian, actress, left-wing activist (born in Newton, raised in California and Texas)
 David Garrard (born 1978), quarterback for the Jacksonville Jaguars (Plainfield, raised in Durham, North Carolina)
 Paul Gleason (1939–2006), actor, The Breakfast Club (Jersey City, raised in Florida)
 Mike Goodson (born 1987), running back for the Oakland Raiders (born in Irvington, raised in Texas)
 Chuck Greenberg (born 1961), former owner of the Texas Rangers (Englewood, raised in Pittsburgh)
 Robert David Hall (born 1947), actor, CSI (East Orange, moved to California)
 Sterling Hayden (1916–1986), actor (born in Upper Montclair; as a child, moved to New Hampshire, Massachusetts, Pennsylvania, D.C., and Maine)
 Pepe Hern (1927–2009), actor raised in California
 Jason Heyward (born 1989), right fielder for the Chicago Cubs (Ridgewood, raised in Georgia)
 Debra Hill (1950–2005), screenwriter, producer (Haddonfield, grew up in Philadelphia)
 Linda Hunt (born 1945), Oscar-winning actress (Morristown, raised in Westport, Connecticut)
 Ice-T (born 1958), rapper and actor (Newark, moved to Los Angeles)
 Richie Incognito (born 1983), guard for the Buffalo Bills (Englewood, grew up in Glendale, Arizona)
 Derek Jeter (born 1974), shortstop for the New York Yankees (born in Pequannock, but raised primarily in Kalamazoo, Michigan)
 Richard Kind (born 1956), actor, Mad About You, Spin City (Trenton, raised in Pennsylvania)
 Bobby Korecky (born 1979), relief pitcher for the Toronto Blue Jays (Hillside, moved to Michigan)
 Alfred L. Kroeber (1876–1960), cultural anthropologist (Hoboken, grew up in New York)
 Scott LaFaro (1936–1961), jazz double bassist (Irvington, grew up in Geneva, New York)
Lila Lee (1905–1973), silent and early sound film actress from Union City, grew up in New York City
 Sue Ane Langdon (born 1936), actress, Arnie, Bachelor Father (Paterson, raised in New York, Michigan, and Oregon)
 Joshua Lederberg (1925–2008), Nobel Prize–winning molecular biologist (Montclair, raised in Manhattan)
 Gordon MacRae (1921–1986), actor, singer (East Orange, raised in Massachusetts and New York)
 Norman Mailer (1923–2007), Pulitzer Prize-winning novelist, essayist, poet (Long Branch, raised in Brooklyn)
Camryn Manheim (born 1961), Emmy-winning actress & left-wing activist, The Practice, Ghost Whisperer, The L Word (West Caldwell, grew up in Peoria, Illinois)
Marc Maron (born 1963), comedian, actor, podcaster (born in Jersey City, raised in Wayne, Alaska and Albuquerque)
 Richard Matheson (1926–2013), sci-fi and fantasy author and screenwriter (Allendale, raised in Brooklyn)
 Lindsey McKeon (born 1982), actress, Saved by the Bell: The New Class, Guiding Light (Summit, raised in Los Angeles)
Kate Micucci (born 1980), actress, comedian, and singer-songwriter (born in NJ, raised in Nazareth, Pennsylvania)
 Bob Milacki (born 1964), former MLB pitcher, primarily with the Baltimore Orioles (Trenton, raised in Lake Havasu City, Arizona)
 Christina Milian (born 1981), R&B and pop singer-songwriter, dancer, actress, and model (Jersey City, grew up in Waldorf, Maryland, moved to Los Angeles)
 Eric Millegan (born 1974), actor, Zack Addy on Bones (Hackettstown, raised in Springfield, Oregon)
 Susan Mikula, artist and photographer (raised in New Hampshire)
 Philip Morrison (1915–2005), prominent physicist (Somerville, grew up in Pittsburgh)
 Charlie Morton (born 1983), starting pitcher for the Tampa Bay Rays (Flemington, raised in Trumbull, Connecticut)
 Montell Owens (born 1984), fullback for the Jacksonville Jaguars (Plainfield, moved to Delaware)
 Daniel Pearl (1963–2002), journalist who was kidnapped and killed by Al-Qaeda (Princeton, grew up in Los Angeles)
 A. J. Price (born 1986), point guard for the Indiana Pacers (Orange, raised in East Massapequa, New York)
 Dana Reeve (1961–2006), actress, singer, widow of Christopher Reeve (born in Teaneck, raised in Greenburgh, New York)
 Dennis Rodman (born 1961), former NBA forward, who played primarily with the Detroit Pistons and the Chicago Bulls (Trenton, grew up in Dallas, Texas)
Joe Rogan (born 1967), comedian, actor, UFC color commentator (born in Bridgewater, raised in Newton, Massachusetts)
Paul Rudd (born 1969), actor, Knocked Up, The 40-Year-Old Virgin, Friends (born in Passaic, raised in Overland Park, Kansas)
 Zoe Saldana (born 1978), actress, Avatar, Pirates of the Caribbean, Star Trek (Passaic, raised in Queens, New York)
 Antonin Scalia (1936–2016), associate justice of the U.S. Supreme Court (Trenton, raised in Queens, New York)
 Cindy Sherman (born 1954), photographer (born in Glen Ridge, raised in Huntington, New York)
 Paul Simon (born 1941), musician, composer (born in Newark, grew up in Queens, New York)
 T. O'Conor Sloane III (1912–2003), Doubleday editor (born in South Orange, grew up in Brooklyn)
 Shaquille O'Neal (born 1972), basketball Hall of Famer, 15-time NBA All-Star center (Newark)
 Kevin Spacey (born 1959), actor (born in South Orange, grew up in Southern California)
 J. Michael Straczynski (born 1954), writer, producer, creator of Babylon 5 and its spin-off (born in Paterson, grew up in different parts of the country)
 Red Strader (1902–1956), AAFC and NFL head coach (Newton, raised in Modesto, California)
 Dave Thomas (1932–2002), founder of the Wendy's fast food restaurant chain (born in Atlantic City, grew up in different parts of the country)
Jack Warden (1920–2006), Emmy-winning actor, N.Y.P.D., The Bad News Bears, Crazy Like a Fox (Newark, grew up in Louisville, Kentucky)
Liza Weil (born 1977), actress, Paris Geller on Gilmore Girls (born in NJ, raised in Lansdale, Pennsylvania)
William Carlos Williams (1883–1963), poet (Rutherford), grew up in Dominican Republic
 Jane Wyatt (1910–2006), three-time Emmy-winning actress, Father Knows Best (Mahwah, raised in New York City)
 Nick Zano (born 1978), actor, What I Like About You, Beverly Hills Chihuahua (Nutley, grew up in Wellington, Florida)

Born elsewhere, raised in New Jersey

 Soren Sorensen Adams (1878–1963), inventor of the Joy buzzer (born Aarhus, Denmark, grew up Perth Amboy, died Asbury Park)
 Juan Agudelo (born 1992), soccer player for the New York Red Bulls and the U.S. men's national team (born in Colombia, raised in Barnegat)
 Akon (born 1973), platinum R&B singer (born in St. Louis, Missouri, partly raised in Senegal, then moved to Jersey City)
 Carlo Alban (born 1979), actor, Prison Break (born in Ecuador, grew up in Sayreville)
 Jeff Anderson (born 1970), actor, Randal Graves in Kevin Smith's View Askewniverse (born in Connecticut, raised in Atlantic Highlands)
 Mark Attanasio, owner of the Milwaukee Brewers (The Bronx, raised in Tenafly)
Trey Anastasio (born 1964), guitarist, composer, and vocalist for the rock band Phish (Fort Worth, Texas, raised in Princeton)
 Kyle Anderson (born 1993), forward for the San Antonio Spurs (New York City, raised in North Bergen and Fairview)
 Ben Bailey (born 1970), comedian, former host of Cash Cab (Bowling Green, Kentucky, grew up in Chatham)
 Oxiris Barbot, Commissioner of Health of the City of New York
 John Basilone (1916–1945), Marine, Medal of Honor recipient (Buffalo, New York, grew up in Raritan)
 Joe Bastardi (born 1955), weather forecaster (Providence, Rhode Island, partly raised in Somers Point)
 Laura Benanti (born 1979), Tony Award-winning Broadway actress (New York City, grew up in Kinnelon)
Guy Benson (born 1985), journalist, pundit, Fox News contributor (Saudi Arabia, raised in Ridgewood)
 Moe Berg (1902–1972), MLB catcher and spy during World War II (New York City, raised in Newark)
 Steve Berman (born 1968), author (Philadelphia, raised in Cherry Hill)
 Bonnie Bernstein (born 1970), television and radio sportscaster (Brooklyn, raised in Howell)
 Ahmed Best (born 1973), voice actor, Jar Jar Binks in the Star Wars prequel trilogy (New York City, raised in Maplewood)
 Michael Ian Black (born 1971), comedian, actor, Ed, The State, Viva Variety (Chicago, raised in Hillsborough)
 Cory Booker (born 1969), politician, former mayor of Newark; current United States Senator (born in Washington, D.C., raised in Harrington Park)
 Anthony Bourdain (1956–2018), chef, author and television personality (New York City, grew up in Leonia)
 James L. Brooks (born 1940), film and television producer and director (Brooklyn, grew up in North Bergen)
 Joe Budden (born 1980), rap musician (Spanish Harlem, raised in Jersey City)
 Tisha Campbell-Martin (born 1968), actress (Oklahoma City, raised in Newark)
 Johnny Cannizzaro, actor, Jersey Boys, writer, producer (Brooklyn, New York, raised in Holmdel)
 John Carlson (born 1990), NHL defenseman (Natick, Massachusetts, raised in Colonia) 
 Luis Castillo (born 1983), NFL defensive end, formerly of the San Diego Chargers (Brooklyn, raised in Garfield)
 Kevin Chamberlin (born 1963), actor, Road to Perdition, Die Hard with a Vengeance (Baltimore, Maryland, raised in Moorestown)
 Mona Charen (born 1957), columnist, political analyst, author (New York City, raised in Livingston)
 David Chase (born 1945), creator, The Sopranos (Mount Vernon, New York, grew up in Clifton and North Caldwell)
 Chino XL (born 1971), rapper, actor (Bronx, grew up in East Orange)
 Lauren Cohan (born 1982), actress, Maggie Greene on The Walking Dead (Philadelphia, partially raised in Cherry Hill)
 Rhys Coiro (born 1979), actor, Billy Walsh on Entourage (Calabria, Italy, moved to Princeton)
 Judith Ortiz Cofer (1952–2016), author (Hormigueros, Puerto Rico, raised in Paterson)
 Doris Coley (1941–2000), later known as Doris Coley-Kenner and then Doris Kenner-Jackson, singer with The Shirelles
 James Comey (born 1960), Director of the Federal Bureau of Investigation (Yonkers, New York, grew up in Allendale)
 Monica Crowley (born 1968), radio and television commentator (born in Arizona, raised in Warren Township)
 Tom Cruise (born 1962), actor (Syracuse, New York, grew up in Glen Ridge)
 Michael Cudlitz (born 1964), actor, Southland, The Walking Dead, Standoff (Long Island, New York, raised in Lakewood)
 David Curtiss (born 2002), competitive swimmer (Yardley, Pennsylvania, raised in Pennington and Hamilton)
David DeJesus (born 1979), Major League Baseball outfielder (Brooklyn, grew up in Manalapan Township)
Kat DeLuna (born 1987), pop and R&B singer (Bronx, New York, partly raised in Newark)
 William Demarest (1892–1983), character actor (St. Paul, Minnesota, grew up in New Bridge in Bergen County)
 Rosemarie DeWitt (born 1974), actress, United States of Tara, Standoff (Queens, New York, raised in Hanover Township)
 Joey Diaz (born 1963), stand-up comedian, actor (Havana, Cuba, raised in North Bergen)
 Sean Doolittle (born 1986), relief pitcher for the Washington Nationals (Rapid City, South Dakota, grew up in Tabernacle)
 Karen Duffy (born 1961), model and actress (New York City, grew up in Park Ridge)
 Tyler Ennis (born 1994), point guard for the Houston Rockets (Brampton, Ontario, raised in Newark)
 Tali Farhadian (born 1974 or 1975), former US federal prosecutor (Englewood Cliffs)
 Andrew Fastow (born 1961), CFO at Enron, convicted felon (Washington, D.C., grew up in New Providence)
 Linda Fiorentino (born 1958), actress (Philadelphia, grew up in Turnersville)
 Oscar Fraley (1914–1994), co-author of Eliot Ness's memoir, The Untouchables (Philadelphia, grew up in Woodbury)
 Lawrence Frank (born 1970), professional basketball coach (New York City, raised in Teaneck)
Milton Friedman (1912–2006), Nobel Prize-winning economist, statistician, and public intellectual (Brooklyn, grew up in Rahway)
 Daisy Fuentes (born 1966), model and TV personality (Havana, Cuba, grew up in Newark and Harrison)
 Junior Galette (born 1988), defensive end and linebacker for the New Orleans Saints (Port-au-Prince, Haiti, grew up in Montvale)
 Jim Gary (1939–2006), sculptor (born in Sebastian, Florida, grew up from infancy in Colts Neck and resided in New Jersey for the rest of his life)
Camille Grammer (born 1963), cast member on The Real Housewives of Beverly Hills (Newport Beach, California, raised in Jersey City)
 Bob Guccione (1930–2010), founder and publisher of Penthouse magazine (Brooklyn, raised in Bergenfield)
 Vida Guerra (born 1980), model (Havana, raised in Perth Amboy)
 Valerie Harper (1939–2019), actress (Suffern, raised in Jersey City)
 Debbie Harry (born 1945), singer and actress (Miami, raised in Hawthorne)
 Anne Hathaway (born 1982), actress (born in Brooklyn, raised in Millburn)
Ethan Hawke (born 1970), actor (Austin, Texas, partly raised in West Windsor)
 Bob Herbert (born 1945), op-ed columnist for The New York Times (Brooklyn, raised in Montclair)
Orel Hershiser (born 1958), Cy Young-winning baseball pitcher and ESPN baseball analyst (Buffalo, New York, raised in Cherry Hill)
 Will Hill (born 1990), safety for the Baltimore Ravens (Jacksonville, Florida, raised in West Orange)
 Lloyd Huck (1922–2012), business executive and philanthropist (Brooklyn, raised in Nutley)
 Harold L. Humes (1926–1992), novelist, co-founder of The Paris Review (Douglas, Arizona, raised in Princeton)
 Toomas Hendrik Ilves (born 1953), President of Estonia (Stockholm, Sweden, raised in Leonia)
 Monte Irvin (1919–2016), HOF baseball player (Haleburg, Alabama, grew up in Orange)
Kyrie Irving (born 1992) point guard for the Brooklyn Nets (born in Australia, raised in West Orange) 
Sheena Iyengar (born 1969), professor at Columbia Business School, specializing in research on choice (born in Toronto, grew up in Flushing, Queens, and Elmwood Park)
 Millie Jackson (born 1944), R&B/soul singer-songwriter (Thomson, Georgia, raised in Newark and Brooklyn)
Sharpe James (born 1936), former New Jersey State Senator and mayor of Newark, convicted criminal (born in Jacksonville, grew up in Newark)
 Chris Jent (born 1970), NBA player, assistant coach for the Cleveland Cavaliers (Orange, California, grew up in Sparta)
 Joe Jonas (born 1989), singer, member of the Jonas Brothers (Casa Grande, Arizona, grew up in Wyckoff)
 Nick Jonas (born 1992), singer, member of the Jonas Brothers (Dallas, grew up in Wyckoff)
 Brian Joo (born 1981), Korean singer (Los Angeles, raised in Absecon)
 Michael B. Jordan (born 1987), actor (Santa Ana, California, grew up in Newark)
 Ryan Kalish (born 1988), outfielder with the Chicago Cubs (Los Angeles, raised in Shrewsbury)
 Kevin Kelly (born 1952), founding executive editor of Wired magazine (born in Pennsylvania, grew up in Westfield)
 Michael Kidd-Gilchrist (born 1993), small forward for the Charlotte Hornets (Philadelphia, grew up in Somerdale)
 Ezra Koenig (born 1984), musician, Vampire Weekend (New York City, raised in Northern New Jersey)
 Michael Landon (1936–1991), actor, Bonanza, Little House on the Prairie (Queens, New York raised in Collingswood)
 Ailee, real name Amy Lee (born 1989), Korean singer (Denver, Colorado, grew up in Palisades Park and Leonia)
 Ted Leo (born 1970), indie rock musician (South Bend, Indiana, raised in Bloomfield)
 A. Leo Levin (1919–2015), law professor at the University of Pennsylvania Law School
 Samm Levine (born 1982), actor, Freaks and Geeks, Inglourious Basterds (Chicago, raised in Fort Lee)
 Carl Lewis (born 1961), track and field legend, nine-time Olympic gold medalist (born in Birmingham, Alabama, grew up in Willingboro)
 Richard Lewis (born 1947), comedian, actor, Anything but Love, Curb Your Enthusiasm (Brooklyn, raised in Englewood)
G. Gordon Liddy (1930–2021), chief operative for the White House Plumbers unit under the Nixon administration (Brooklyn, raised in Hoboken and West Caldwell)
 Naomi Cornelia Long Madgett (1923–2020), poet (Norfolk, Virginia, partly raised in East Orange)
Bill Maher (born 1956), comedian, actor, TV personality, left wing pundit, Real Time with Bill Maher (New York City, grew up in River Vale)
 Michelle Malkin (born 1970), conservative pundit (Philadelphia, grew up in Absecon)
 Constantine Maroulis (born 1975), singer (New York City, grew up in Wyckoff)
 Gene Mayer (born 1956), tennis player (Queens, grew up in Wayne)
 Page McConnell (born 1963), songwriter and keyboardist with the rock band Phish (Philadelphia, raised in Basking Ridge)
 Devin McCourty (born 1987), free safety for the New England Patriots (Nyack, New York, raised in Montvale)
 John C. McGinley (born 1959), actor, Perry Cox on Scrubs (New York City, grew up in Millburn)
 Lea Michele (born 1986), actress, Rachel Berry on Glee (Bronx, raised in Tenafly)
 Natalia Alexandra Mitsuoka (born 1988), Argentinian figure skater (born in Argentina, raised in New Providence)
 Matt Mulhern (born 1960), actor, filmmaker, Major Dad (Philadelphia, raised in Montvale)
Brittany Murphy (1977–2009), actress, King of the Hill, Happy Feet, 8 Mile (Atlanta, grew up in Edison and Burbank, California)
 Jim Nantz (born 1959), sportscaster for CBS Sports (Charlotte, North Carolina, grew up in Colts Neck Township)
 J. J. North, actress (Philadelphia, raised in New Jersey)
 Karen O (born 1978), lead singer of the Yeah Yeah Yeahs (born in South Korea, raised in Englewood)
 Christine O'Donnell (born 1969), 2010 Republican candidate for Senator of Delaware (Philadelphia, grew up in Moorestown)
 Brian O'Halloran (born 1969), actor in Kevin Smith's View Askewniverse (Manhattan, partly raised in Old Bridge)
 Shaun O'Hara (born 1977), former center for the Cleveland Browns and New York Giants (Chicago, grew up in Hillsborough Township)
 Rick Overton (born 1954), actor, comedian (Forest Hills, raised in Englewood)
 Kyle Palmieri (born 1991), hockey player (Smithtown, New York, grew up in Montvale)
 Scott Patterson (born 1958), actor, Gilmore Girls, The Event, Aliens in America (Philadelphia, raised in Haddonfield)
 Piper Perabo (born 1976), actress, Cheaper by the Dozen (Dallas, grew up in Toms River)
 Maxwell Perkins (1884–1947), editor for Ernest Hemingway, F. Scott Fitzgerald, and Thomas Wolfe (New York City, grew up in Plainfield)
Clarke Peters (born 1952), actor, Det. Lester Freamon on The Wire (New York City, grew up in Englewood)
 Shaun Phillips (born 1981), outside linebacker for the San Diego Chargers (Philadelphia, raised in Willingboro Township)
 Maria Pitillo (born 1965), actress, Providence, Partners, Godzilla (Elmira, NY, raised in Mahwah)
 Carol Potter (born 1948), actress, Beverly Hills, 90210, Sunset Beach (New York City, grew up in Tenafly)
 Dwight Muhammad Qawi (born 1953), former world boxing champion and Boxing Hall of Famer (Baltimore, grew up in Camden)
Becky Quick (born 1972), co-anchorwoman of CNBC's Squawk Box (born in Minneapolis, raised in Medford)
 Anna Quindlen (born 1953), author, journalist, and Pulitzer Prize-winning columnist (Philadelphia, graduated from South Brunswick High School in South Brunswick)
 B. J. Raji (born 1986), nose tackle for the Green Bay Packers (New York City, raised in Washington Township)
Christopher Reeve (1952–2004), actor (New York City, grew up in Princeton)
 Shirley Alston-Reeves (born Shirley Owens, 1941), lead singer of The Shirelles (grew up in Passaic)
 Christina Ricci (born 1980), actress (Santa Monica, California, grew up in Montclair)
 Cameron Richardson (born 1979), actress and model, Cover Me, Point Pleasant, Alvin and the Chipmunks (Baton Rouge, Louisiana, raised in Old Bridge Township)
 Dennis Ritchie (1941–2011), computer scientist who created the C programming language and co-created Unix (Bronxville, NY, raised in Summit)
 Ian Roberts (born 1965), actor, comedian, Upright Citizens Brigade, Reno 911! (Queens, New York, raised in Secaucus)
 Michelle Rodriguez (born 1978), actress, Avatar, the Fast and the Furious movies, S.W.A.T. (Bexar County, Texas, partly raised in Jersey City)
 Julie Roginsky (born 1973), Democratic Party strategist and Fox News contributor (Moscow, Russia, partially raised in Plainsboro)
 Howie Roseman (born 1975), general manager for the Philadelphia Eagles (Brooklyn, raised in Marlboro)
Jeffrey Rosen, billionaire businessman
 Carl Sagan (1934–1996), astronomer, astrochemist and author (Ithaca, New York, grew up in Rahway)
 Samardo Samuels (born 1989), player for the Cleveland Cavaliers (Trelawny, Jamaica, raised in Newark)
 Gabe Saporta (born 1979), singer and musician, currently for the pop rock band Cobra Starship (Montevideo, Uruguay, grew up in Springfield Township)
 Susan Sarandon (born 1946), actress (New York City, grew up in Edison)
 Jessica Savitch (1947–1983), television journalist (Kennett Square, Pennsylvania, partly raised in Margate City)
 Adam Schlesinger (1967–2020), musician (Fountains of Wayne), songwriter, producer, arranger (Manhattan, grew up in Montclair)
Jon Seda (born 1970), actor, Homicide: Life on the Street, Kevin Hill, Close to Home (New York City, grew up in Clifton)
 Richie Scheinblum (1942–2021), Major League Baseball All Star outfielder (South Bronx, New York City, grew up in Englewood)
 Gene Shalit (born 1926), film critic of NBC's Today (New York City, raised in Morristown)
Brooke Shields (born 1965), actress, Suddenly Susan (New York City, grew up in Englewood)
 Andrew Shue (born 1967), actor, Melrose Place (Wilmington, Delaware, raised in South Orange)
 Elisabeth Shue (born 1963), actress, Back to the Future Part II (Wilmington, Delaware, raised in South Orange)
 George P. Shultz (1920–2021). Secretary of State, Secretary of the Treasury, Director of the Office of Management and Budget, and Secretary of Labor (New York City, grew up in Englewood)
Bryan Singer (born 1965), film director (New York City, grew up in Princeton Junction)
 Kiki Smith (born 1954), artist and sculptor; her father was the sculptor Tony Smith (born in West Germany, raised in South Orange from infancy to high school)
 Patti Smith (born 1946), rock musician (Chicago, grew up in Woodbury)
David Smukler (1914–1971), NFL football player
 John Spencer (1946–2005), actor, The West Wing, L.A. Law, The Rock (New York City, grew up in Totowa)
Steven Spielberg (born 1946), legendary Hollywood director and producer (Cincinnati, partly raised in Haddon Township)
 David Stern (1942–2020), NBA commissioner, member of the Basketball Hall of Fame (New York City, raised in Teaneck)
 Jon Stewart (born 1962), comedian, actor and television personality (New York City, grew up in Lawrence Township)
 SZA, real name Solana Rowe (born 1989), PBR&B singer-songwriter, signed to Top Dawg Entertainment (St. Louis, Missouri, raised in Maplewood)
 Jack Tatum (1948–2010), NFL safety primarily with the Oakland Raiders (Cherryville, North Carolina, grew up in Passaic)
 Joseph Hooton Taylor Jr. (born 1941), Nobel Prize-winning astrophysicist (Philadelphia, raised in Cinnaminson)
 Lance Thomas (born 1988), player for the New Orleans Hornets (Brooklyn, New York, raised in Scotch Plains)
 Roger Y. Tsien (1952–2016), Nobel Prize–winning biochemist (New York City, grew up in Livingston)
Steven Van Zandt (born 1950), rock musician, actor, The Sopranos (Winthrop, Massachusetts, grew up in Middletown)
 Alan Veingrad (born 1963), NFL football player (Brooklyn, New York, grew up in Elizabeth)
 Bruce Vilanch (born 1948), comedy writer (New York City, raised in Paterson)
 Frank Vincent (1937–2017), actor (North Adams, Massachusetts, grew up in Jersey City)
 Voltaire (born 1967), musician (Havana, Cuba)
 Rodney Wallace (born 1981), mixed martial artist (Bamberg, South Carolina, raised in Passaic)
 Carl B. Weinberg, economist, founder of High Frequency Economics (Bronx, raised in Teaneck)
 John C. Whitehead (1922–2015), banker, civil servant, chairman of the Lower Manhattan Development Corporation (Evanston, Illinois, raised in Montclair)
 Brian Williams (born 1959), disgraced anchor of NBC Nightly News (Elmira, New York, partly raised in Middletown)
 Bruce Willis (born 1955), actor (Idar-Oberstein, born in Germany, grew up in Penns Grove)
Scott Wolf (born 1968), actor, Party of Five, Everwood, The Nine (Boston, raised in West Orange)
 Teresa Wright (1918–2005), Oscar-winning actress, The Best Years of Our Lives, The Pride of the Yankees (New York City, grew up in Maplewood)

Born and raised elsewhere, live(d) in New Jersey

 Danny Aiello (born New York City), lived in Saddle River
 Alan Alda (born New York City), lives in Leonia
 Muhammad Ali (born Louisville, Kentucky), lived in Cherry Hill
 Paul Anka (born Ottawa, Ontario, Canada), lives in Tenafly
 AZ (born New York City), lives in Englewood
 Brian Baldinger (born Pittsburgh, Pennsylvania), lives in Cherry Hill
 Jesse Barfield (born Joliet, Illinois), lives in Tenafly
 Yogi Berra (born St. Louis, Missouri), lived in Montclair
 George Benson (born Pittsburgh, Pennsylvania), lives in Englewood
 Mary J. Blige (born New York City), lives in Cresskill
 Shmuley Boteach (born Los Angeles), lives in Englewood
 Andre Braugher (born Chicago, Illinois), lives in South Orange
 Jim Bunning (born Southgate, Kentucky), lives in Cherry Hill
 Jim Byrnes (born St. Louis, Missouri), lives in Allendale
 Harry Carson (born Florence, South Carolina), lives in Franklin Lakes
 Vince Carter (born Daytona Beach, Florida), lives in Saddle River
 Sarah Chang (born Philadelphia, Pennsylvania), lives in Cherry Hill
 Connie Chung (born Washington, D.C.), lives in Middletown
 Mary Higgins Clark (born New York City), lives in Saddle River
 Bobby Clarke (born Flin Flon, Manitoba), lives in Cherry Hill
 Alon Cohen (born Israel), lives in Tenafly
 Stephen Colbert (born Charleston, South Carolina), lives in Montclair
 Sean Combs ("Diddy") (born New York City), lives in Alpine
Lotta Crabtree (1847–1924), actress, comedian, philanthropist (born New York City), lived in Hopatcong
 Peter Criss (born Brooklyn, New York), lives in Wall Township
 Johnny Damon (born Fort Riley, Kansas), lives in Ridgewood
 Damon Dash (born New York City), lives in Alpine
 Darryl Dawkins (born Orlando, Florida), lives in Marlboro
Lou Dobbs (born Texas, lives in Wantage)
 Steve Doocy (born Algona, Iowa), lives in Wyckoff
 Thomas Edison (born Milan, Ohio), lived in Newark and West Orange
 Albert Einstein (born Ulm, Germany), lived in Princeton
 Halim El-Dabh (born Cairo, Egypt), lives in Cresskill
 Missy Elliott, real name Melissa Elliott (born Portsmouth, Virginia), lives in Kinnelon
 Jeff Feagles (born Anaheim, California), lives in Ridgewood
 Lior Haramaty (born Israel), lives in Tenafly
 Bobby Hebb (born Nashville, Tennessee), lives in Cresskill
 Celeste Holm (1917–2012), Oscar-winning actress (born in Manhattan, lived in Long Valley)
 Sam Huff (born Morgantown, West Virginia), lives in Franklin Lakes
 Jay-Z (born New York City), lives in Alpine
 Tommy John (born Terre Haute, Indiana), lives in Franklin Lakes
 Michael Johns (born Allentown, Pennsylvania), lives in Deptford
 Jim Jones (born New York City), rapper, lives in Fair Lawn
 Zab Judah (born New York City), lives in Teaneck
 Kitty Kallen (born Philadelphia, Pennsylvania), lives in Englewood
 Jevon Kearse (born Fort Myers, Florida), lives in Moorestown
 Jason Kidd (born San Francisco, California), lives in Saddle River
 Lil' Kim (born New York City), lives in Alpine
 Bernard King (born New York City), lives in Franklin Lakes
 Michael Landon (born Queens, New York City), lived in Collingswood
 Phoebe Laub (born New York City), lives in Teaneck
 Bettye LaVette (born Muskegon, Michigan), lives in West Orange
 Shulem Lemmer (born Borough Park, Brooklyn, New York City), lives in Toms River, singer
 Heather Locklear (born Westwood, Los Angeles), lives in Wayne
 Mario (born Baltimore, Maryland), lives in Teaneck
 Tino Martinez (born Tampa, Florida), lives in Tenafly
 Fred Mascherino (born Philadelphia, Pennsylvania), lives in Union
 Don Mattingly (born Evansville, Indiana), lives in Tenafly
 Darryl "D.M.C." McDaniels (born New York City), lives in Wayne
 Bob McGrath (born Ottawa, Illinois), lives in Teaneck
 Donovan McNabb (born Chicago, Illinois), lives in Moorestown
 Bob Menne, born and lives in Demarest
Eddie Murphy (born New York City), lives in Englewood
Thomas Nast (1840–1902), caricaturist, editorial cartoonist (born in Kingdom of Bavaria, lived in Morristown)
 Clarence Charles Newcomer (1923–2005), US District Judge of the United States District Court for the Eastern District of Pennsylvania, lived in Stone Harbor
 Richard Milhous Nixon (born Yorba Linda, California), lived in Saddle River
 Edward Mosberg (1926-2022), Polish-American Holocaust survivor, educator, and philanthropist
 Tina Nordström (born Valluv, Skåne County in Sweden), lives in Englewood Cliffs
 Mehmet Oz  (born Cleveland), lived in, and continues to maintain a presence in Cliffside Park, New Jersey, now lives in Huntington Valley, Pennsylvania.
 Randal Pinkett (born Philadelphia, Pennsylvania), lives in Somerset
 Maury Povich (born Washington, D.C.), lives in Middletown
 Aidan Quinn (born Rockford, Illinois), lives in Englewood
 Willie Randolph (born Holly Hill, South Carolina), lives in Franklin Lakes
 William P. Richardson (1864–1945), co-founder and first Dean of Brooklyn Law School, lived in Morristown
 Geraldo Rivera (born New York City), lived in Middletown
 Sylvia Robinson (born New York City), lives in Englewood
 Chris Rock (born Andrews, South Carolina), lives in Alpine
 Jeremy Roenick (born Boston, Massachusetts), lives in Moorestown
 Jimmy Rollins (born Oakland, California), lives in Woolwich Township
 Ja Rule (born New York City), lives in Saddle River
Lucy Mercer Rutherfurd (1891–1948), socialite, mistress of Franklin D. Roosevelt (born in Washington, DC, lived in Allamuchy)
 CC Sabathia (born Vallejo, California), lives in Alpine
Tito Santana, professional wrestler, (born Mission, Texas), lives in Roxbury
 Gary Sheffield (born Tampa, Florida), lives in Alpine
 Lito Sheppard (born Jacksonville, Florida), lives in Moorestown
 Brooke Shields (born New York City), lives in Englewood
 Joseph Simmons (born New York City), lives in Saddle River
 Kimora Lee Simmons (born St. Louis, Missouri), lives in Saddle River
 Russell Simmons (born New York City), lives in Saddle River
 Phil Simms (born Lebanon, Kentucky), lives in Franklin Lakes
 T. O'Conor Sloane (1851–1940), scientist, inventor, author, editor, educator, and linguist (born New York City), lived in South Orange
 T. O'Conor Sloane Jr. (1879–1963), photographer (born Brooklyn), lived in South Orange
 Wesley Snipes (born Orlando, Florida), lives in Alpine
 Luis Sojo (born Miranda State, Venezuela), lives in Saddle Brook
 Paul Sorvino (born New York City), lives in Tenafly
 James "J.T." Taylor (born Laurens, South Carolina), lives in Franklin Lakes
 Mitch Williams (born Santa Ana, California), lives in Medford
 Woodrow Wilson (born Staunton, Virginia), 28th President of the United States, Governor of New Jersey, lived in Princeton
 Dave Winfield (born Saint Paul, Minnesota), lives in Teaneck
 Stevie Wonder (born Saginaw, Michigan), lives in Alpine
 Feng Yun (born Liaoning, China), lives in New Jersey
 Shou-Wu Zhang (born Hexian, Anhui, China), lives in Tenafly

See also 

 List of colonial governors of New Jersey
 List of governors of New Jersey
 List of New Jersey suffragists
 List of Kean University people
 List of Lawrenceville School alumni
 List of New Brunswick Theological Seminary people
 List of people from Englewood, New Jersey
 List of people from Hoboken, New Jersey
 List of people from Jersey City, New Jersey
 List of justices of the Supreme Court of New Jersey
 List of people from Montclair, New Jersey
 List of people from Newark, New Jersey
 List of people from South Orange, New Jersey
 List of people from Teaneck, New Jersey
 List of people from Union City, New Jersey
 List of Princeton University people
 List of Rutgers University people
 List of Upsala College people
 List of United States representatives from New Jersey
 List of United States senators from New Jersey
 Lists of Americans
 New Jersey Hall of Fame

References